= Franz Grave =

German Catholic bishop (1932–2022)

- Auxiliary bishop emeritus of Essen
- Church: Catholic Church
- Diocese: Essen
- See: Essen
- Appointed: 31 March 1988

Orders
- Ordination: 2 February 1959 by Franz Hengsbach
- Consecration: 3 May 1988 by Franz Hengsbach

Personal details
- Born: 25 November 1932 Essen, Rhineland, Prussia, Germany
- Died: 20 February 2022 (aged 89) Essen, Germany
- Motto: Mundi salvator dominus
- Coat of arms

Franz Grave (25 November 1932 – 19 February 2022) was a German Catholic prelate who served as auxiliary bishop of the Diocese of Essen from 1988 until his retirement in 2008. Grave was focused on intercultural dialogue with Latin America, and projects aimed at fighting unemployment and helping young people in difficult situations.

== Life ==
Grave was born in Essen, Germany, in a family of craftsmen. After his Abitur at the Gymnasium Borbeck in 1953, he studied philosophy and theology. He was ordained to the priesthood on 2 February 1959 at Essen Cathedral by Bishop Franz Hengsbach. He then worked as chaplain at St. Laurentius in Duisburg-Beeck, a parish with mostly industrial workers. From 1965, he was teacher of religion at the municipal Gustav-Stresemann-Realschule in Duisburg, and simultaneously was assistant subsidiar in the parish St. Maximilian, Duisburg in Duisburg-Ruhrort. He was appointed Präses on diocese level of the Kolpingwerk 1966, and also became Präses of the Essen city Kolpingwerk. He held the position until 1972.

In 1970, Grave became head of the department within the diocese that was responsible for the development of pastoral services (Entwicklung pastoraler Dienste) and target group pastoral care (Zielgruppenseelsorge). He received the honorary title Chaplain of His Holiness from Pope Paul VI in 1973. In 1978, he became Domkapitular of the Essen Cathedral, and in 1979 Präses of the workers' association Katholische Arbeitnehmer-Bewegung (KAB) for the diocese. He was appointed Prelate of Honour of His Holiness by Pope John Paul II in 1982, and was responsible for the preparation of the visit of the Pope in Essen on 2 May 1987.

On 31 March 1988, Grave was appointed by the pope as titular bishop of Tingaria in Mauretania, and as auxiliary bishop of the Diocese of Essen. He was the first bishop of the diocese who was born in Essen. He chose for his motto: Mundi salvator dominus (Redeemer of the world is the Lord). He was consecrated as bishop by Hengsbach, along with auxiliary bishops Julius Angerhausen and Wolfgang Große, at the Essen Cathedral on 3 May 1988. Grave served in the functions until his retirement in 2008.

After Hengsbach's death on 24 June 1991, Grave took over his post as leader of the Adveniat action. He was confirmed in 1992, elected by the German Bishops' Conference. He held the post which included several trips to Latin America, until 2008. He served from 1999 to 2008 as a member of the Pontifical Commission for Latin America. In 1993, Grave was appointed Bischofsvikar by Bishop Hubert Luthe, representing the bishop in matters of world-church and social tasks (weltkirchliche und gesellschaftliche Aufgaben). After Luthe resigned on 27 May 2002, Grave was appointed diocesan administrator, serving until Bishop Felix Genn was consecrated as Luthe's successor.

Grave wrote a resignation for reasons of age to Pope Benedict XVI which was accepted on 27 June 2008. He held a mass of thanks on 4 October 2008, his name day, attended by all bishops of Essen. In the following ceremony, Genn thanked him for his service to the diocese over a long time. Grave then served as parish priest in St. Mariae Geburt in Mülheim.

Grave was focused on intercultural dialogue with Latin America, and projects aimed at fighting unemployment and helping young people in difficult situations. He initiated the Bündnis für Erziehung NRW, a statewide collaboration for education. He worked for the curatorium of the Fasel-Stiftung foundation in Duisburg from 2001 to 2018, as president from end of 2009. On 24 July 2011, he spoke, with others, at the central ecumenical memorial service for the victims of the Love Parade disaster.

Grave died in Essen on 19 February 2022, at the age of 89.

== Publications ==
- Heilige unserer Heimat – Anregungen – Hilfen – Vorschläge – Bistum Essen, Diocese of Essen 1974
- Nahe bei den Menschen , Echter-Verlag 1996, ISBN 978-3-429-01845-0
- with Ulrich Engelberg: Kuba, Kirche im Aufbruch, Echter-Verlag 1998, ISBN 978-3-429-02045-3
- with Dorothea Meilwes: Reichtum der Armen, Armut der Reichen, Don Bosco Medien 2001, ISBN 978-3-7698-1318-0
- (ed.) Ulrich Theodor Timpte: In der Bannmeile von Buenos Aires: Eine Gemeinde entsteht (Pastorale Impulse aus Lateinamerika), Don Bosco Medien 2004, ISBN 978-3-7698-1452-1
- Leuchtende Spuren. Gemeinsam auf dem Weg in eine solidarische Welt., Don Bosco Medien 2007, ISBN 978-3-7698-1656-3

== Awards ==
- 1989: Order of Merit of the Federal Republic of Germany
- 2001: Honorary doctorate of the Catholic University Nuestra Señora Reina de la Paz (Universidad Católica de Honduras Nuestra Señora Reina de la Paz, UNICAH) in Tegucigalpa, Honduras, in the faculty of pastoral theology
- 2006: Order of Merit of North Rhine-Westphalia
- 2010: Order of Merit of the Federal Republic of Germany for merits in the Ruhr area, especially the ecumenical social work (GSA) in mining and industries, and his engagements when workshops were closed such as Nokia-Werk Bochum
- 2010: Special Ehrenpreis of the Heinrich-Brauns-Preis for his lifetime achievements
