= Franz-Josef Overbeck =

German bishop and theologian

His Excellency Franz-Josef Overbeck
- Bishop of Essen
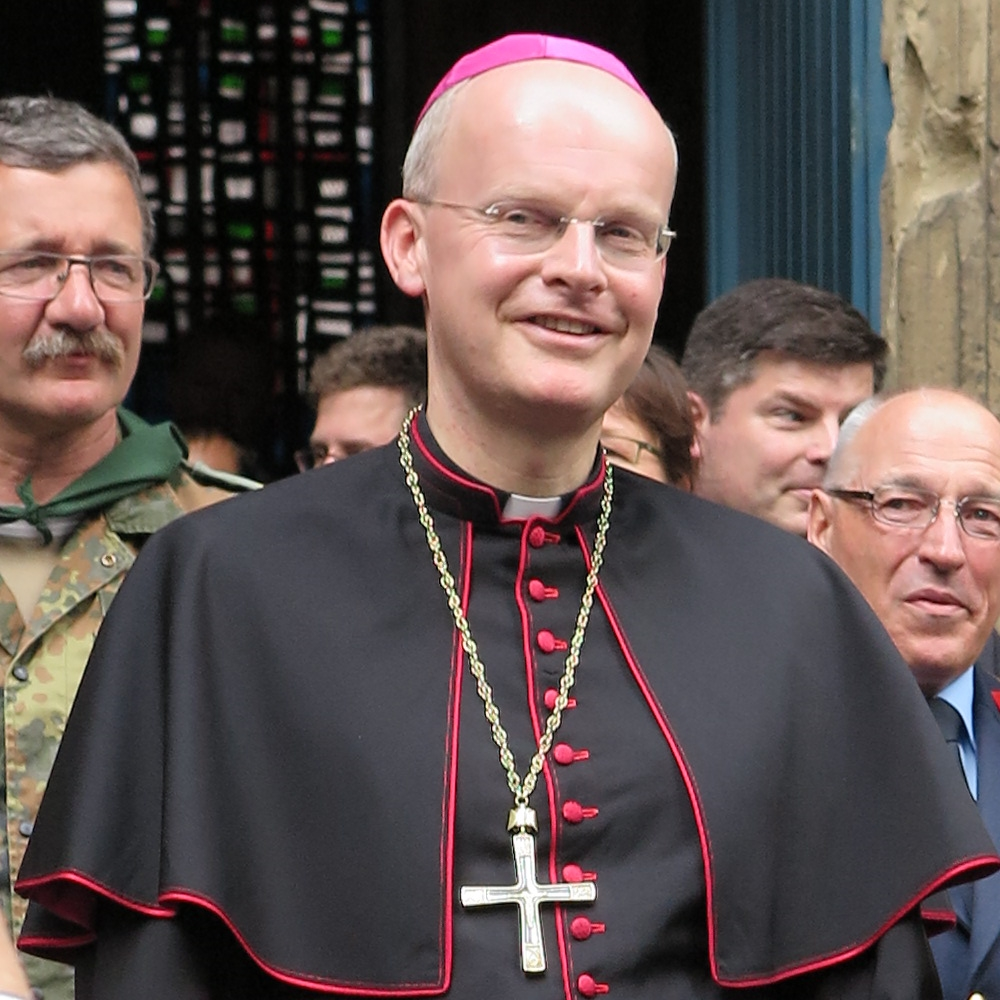
- Diocese: Essen
- Appointed: 28 October 2009
- Installed: 20 December 2009
- Predecessor: Felix Genn

Orders
- Ordination: 10 October 1989 by Joseph Ratzinger
- Consecration: 1 September 2007 by Reinhard Lettmann

Personal details
- Born: 19 June 1964 (age 62) Marl, North Rhine-Westphalia, Federal Republic of Germany
- Denomination: Roman Catholic
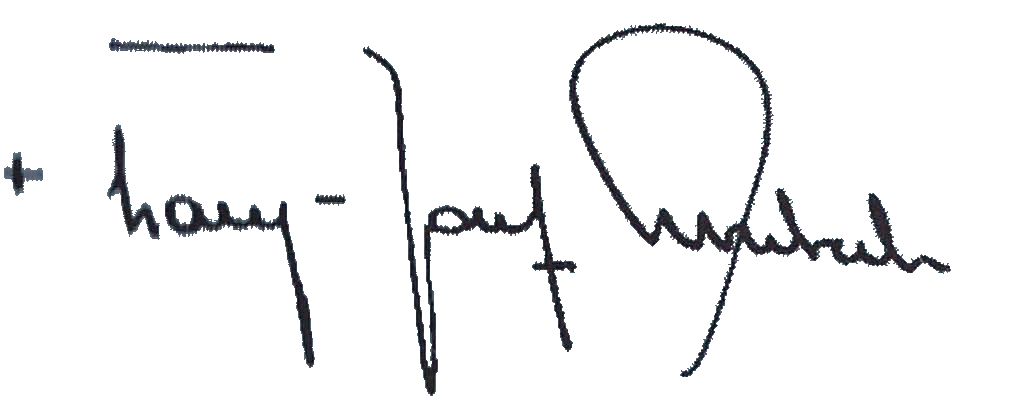
- Signature

- Coat of arms

Franz-Josef Overbeck (born 19 June 1964) is a German bishop of the Catholic Church who has been bishop of Essen since 2009 and bishop of the German military since 2011.

== Biography ==
Franz-Josef Overbeck was born on 19 June 1964 in Marl.

Overbeck studied theology and philosophy at University of Münster and at Collegium Germanicum et Hungaricum in Rome. He was ordained a priest on 10 October 1989.

In 18 July 2007, Pope Benedict XVI named him titular bishop of Mathara in Numidia and auxiliary bishop of Münster. He received his episcopal consecration on 1 September 2007 from Bishop Reinhard Lettmann of Münster. He was apostolic administrator of the diocese from Lettman's retirement in March 2008 until the installation of his successor in March 2009.

On 28 October 2009, Pope Benedict appointed him bishop of Essen. By this time he had been diagnosed with cancer and treated successfully. He was installed there on 20 December. At the time he was the youngest bishop to lead a diocese in Germany.

In 2010 Overbeck was appointed Church assistant to the foundation Centesimus Annus Pro Pontifice (CAPP). The lay-managed foundation promotes Catholic social teaching.

On 24 February 2011, Overbeck was given the additional responsibility of bishop of the Military Ordinariate of Germany; he was installed on 6 May.

Pope Francis named him a member of the Pontifical Commission for Latin America on 15 January 2014 and of the Pontifical Council for Culture on 29 March.

In March 2018 he was elected the bishop delegate of the German Bishops Conference to the Commission of the Bishops' Conferences of the European Union (COMECE). He was elected one of COMECE's vice president's later that year.

In September 2023, Overbeck acknowledged mistakes in handling the sexual allegations against Cardinal Franz Hengsbach, who led the diocese for three decades, finally stepping down in 1991 at the age of 80. Overbeck had unveiled a statue of Hensbach in 2011 despite being aware of the claims made against him.

== Positions ==
In January 2019, Overbeck said there should be reforms in Roman Catholic sexual ethics and that same-sex marriages should be accepted and not be described as immoral. In October 2019, Overbeck said that many Catholics do not understand why women cannot be Roman Catholic deacons or priests and that the ordination of women in the Catholic Church should be allowed. In December 2019, Overbeck said there should be exceptions from clerical celibacy in the Catholic Church. In December 2022, Overbeck said homosexual parents can be good parents.

== Selected works ==
- 2017: Freude und Hoffnung, Ostfildern: Matthias Grünewald Verlag
- 2018: Einstehen für unsere Demokratie, Cologne: J.P. Bachem Medien
