= Salve Regina (Pärt) =

2001 musical composition by Arvo Pärt

- by Arvo Pärt
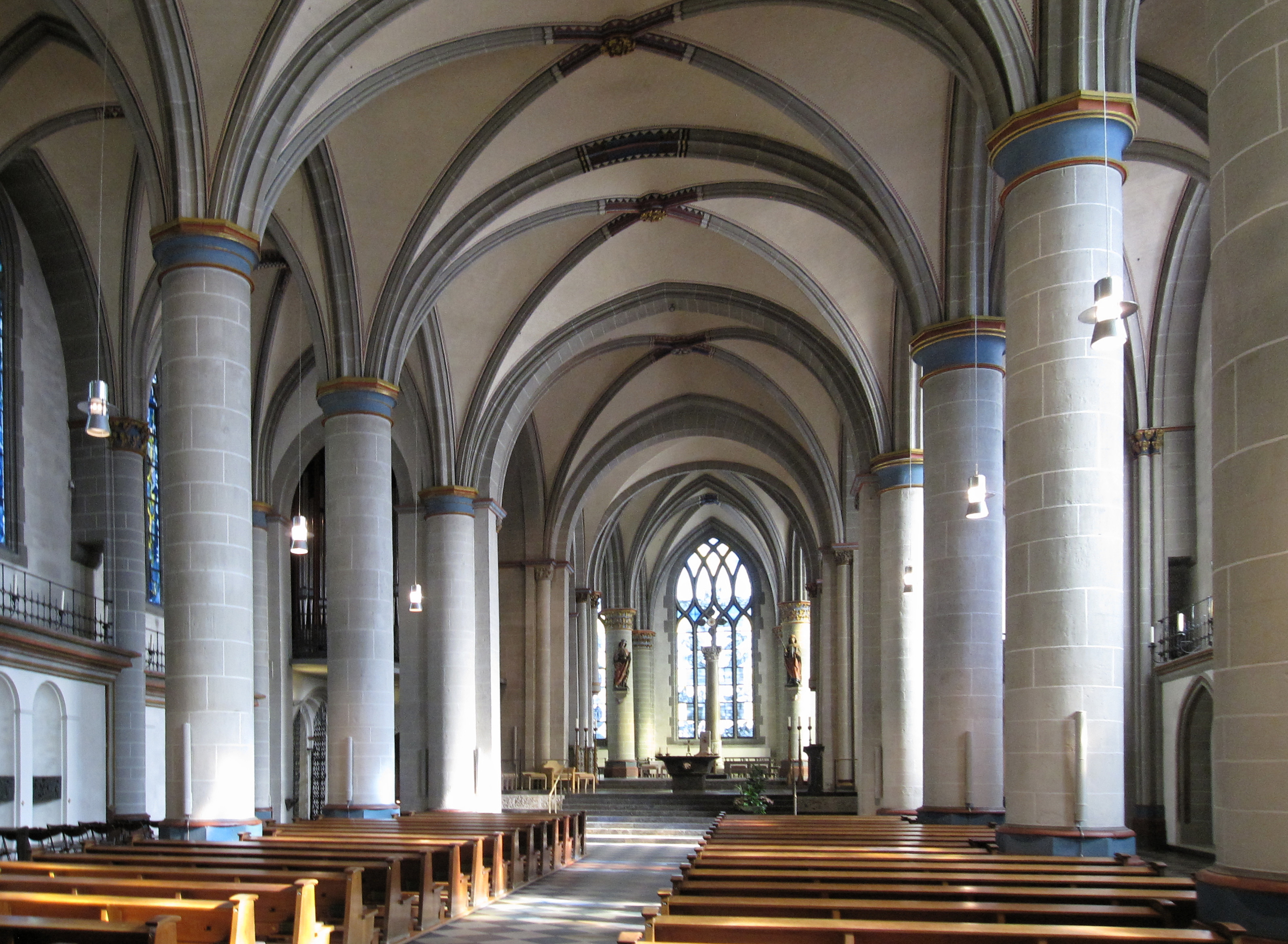
- Interior of Essen Cathedral, where the work was first performed
- Key: E minor
- Form: Anthem
- Text: Hymn "Salve Regina"
- Language: Latin
- Composed: 2001
- Dedication: Hubert Luthe
- Performed: 22 May 2002: Essen
- Published: 2002 by Universal Edition
- Scoring: SATB choir

Salve Regina (Hail Holy Queen, literally: Hail, Queen) is a Marian anthem, a setting by Arvo Pärt of the Latin hymn "Salve Regina" for mixed choir and organ in 2001. It was first performed in Essen Cathedral on 22 May 2002. It was published by Universal Edition in 2002. Pärt arranged the composition for choir, celesta and string orchestra in 2011 for a celebration of 150 years of Italian unity.

== History ==
Salve Regina was commissioned for the celebration on 22 May 2002 of 1150 years since the foundation of Stift Essen (Essen Abbey) and the city of Essen. The day was also the 75th birthday of Hubert Luthe, then Bishop of Essen, to whom the work is dedicated. It was Luthe's wish to have a setting of this text to venerate the Golden Madonna.

Salve Regina was performed by three choirs of the cathedral with the organist Jürgen Karsawa, conducted by Wolfgang Endrös. The work in one movement takes about 12 minutes to perform. It was published by Universal Edition in July 2002.

Pärt arranged the composition for choir, celesta and string orchestra in 2011 for a celebration of 150 years of Italian unity. It was commissioned by the cities of Turin and Milan and was first performed at the Festival Internazionale della Musica di Milano.

== Music ==
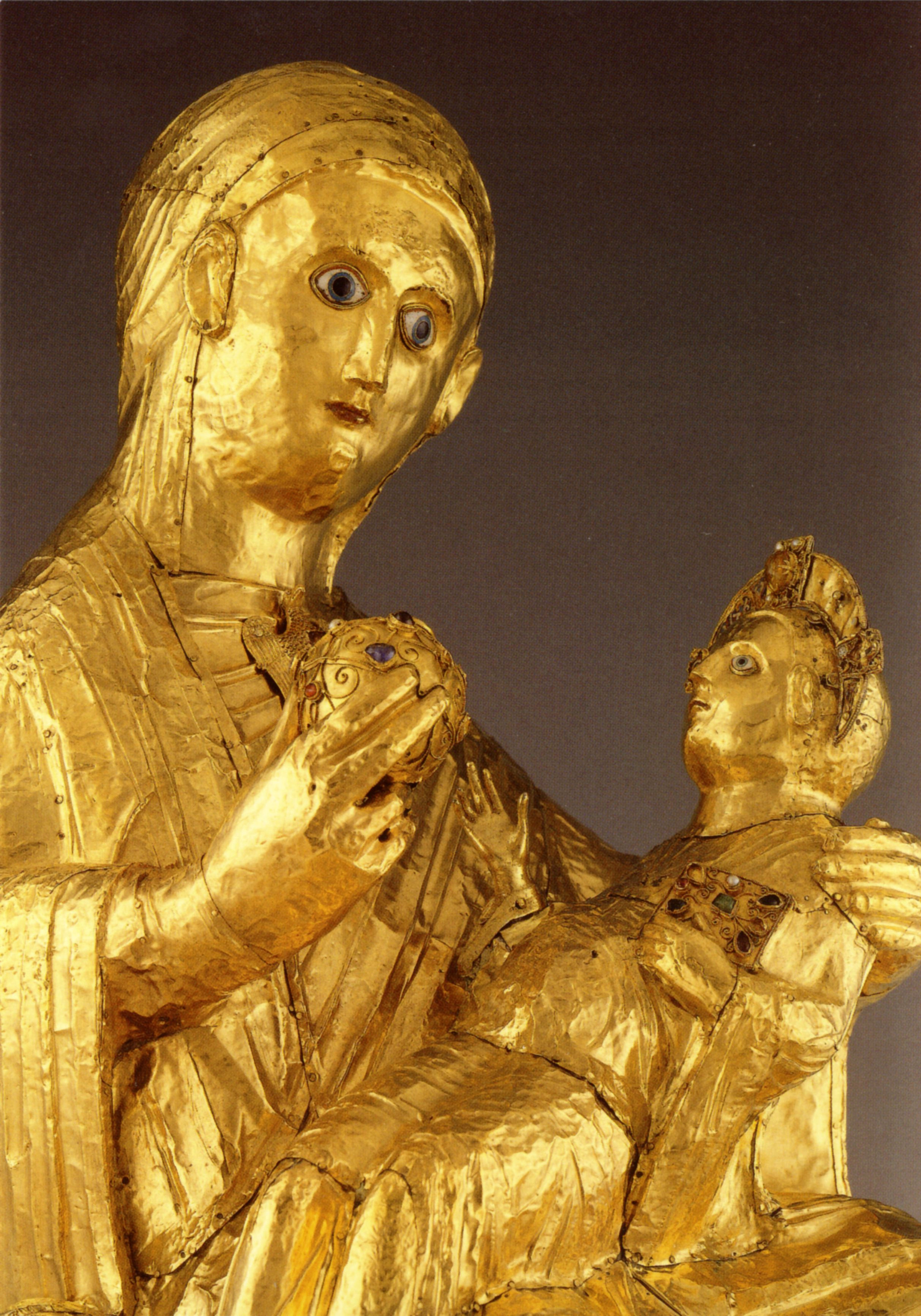
Detail of the Golden Madonna of Essen Cathedral

The work in E minor is mostly in 3/4 time. After an instrumental introduction of 12 measure, all parts sing the greeting "Salve Regina" in unison, marked p (soft). After four instrumental measures the theme is continued, again in unison with a falling line of even long notes: "mater misericordiae" (mother of mercy), after two instrumental measures followed by "vita dulcedo" (sweet life), after two more measures "et spes nostra, salve" (and our hope, hail).

For the following petition, the voices are divided in an upper choir of three women's voices, singing "Ad te clamamus" (To you we cry), and a lower choir of three men's voices continuing "exules filii Evae" (exiles, sons of Eve), alternating as in psalm recitation. While the instrumental interludes and accompaniment move in even quarter notes, sometimes even livelier, the voices stay on each note for at least a measure, often for several measures on one syllable. The dynamics remain soft, intensified to no more than mp in the middle of the phrases. For the next petition, the upper chorus is formed by soprano, alto and tenor, singing "ad te suspiramus" (To you we sigh), continued by alto, tenor and bass: "gementes et flentes in hac lacrimarum valle" (mourning and weeping in this valley of tears). The petitions are repeated, more intensely by a division in eight vocal parts, but still p.

Only tenor and bass begin a new section, marked mp: "Eia ergo, avvocata nostra" (therefore, our advocate). The text "illos tuos misericordes oculos ad nos converte" (your merciful eyes towards us turn) is expressed, marked Largando (slowing) and mf, in polyphony, with the voices picking up the instrumental quarter note movement. In contrast, "et Jesum benedictum fructum ventris tuis" (and Jesus, the blessed fruit of your womb) is rendered in mysterious pianissimo unison, followed, after a general pause by a sudden strong outburst: "nobis post hoc exilium ostende" (to us after this exile show), on mostly dissonant chords, one every measure, ending on an eight-part unresolved chord.

The final line is soft again and for the first time in 4/4 time. The text "O clemens, o pia, o dulcis virgo Maria" (O merciful, o good, o sweet virgin Mary) is divided in four parts, separated by instrumental measures. While the sopranos and altos sing long chords, the tenors and basses repeat in unison each phrase three times, the last one, in 6/4 time, even five times, slowing down (rallentando). After a last instrumental phrase, the composer requests a full measure of silence.

A program note comments: "it builds very gradually to a late, majestic climax—unison vocal lines at the outset, broader harmonies later, some intriguing eccentricities in the organ part along the way".

== Recordings ==
The first recording of Salve Regina is part of Pärt: Triodion & other choral works, performed by Polyphony, conducted by Stephen Layton, and published by Hyperion. It was recorded in 2003 in the presence of the composer at London's Temple Church.

Salve Regina is part of a collection of music by Pärt titled Da Pacem, performed by the Estonian Philharmonic Chamber Choir, conducted by Paul Hillier, with organist Christopher Bowers-Broadbent.
