= Ludger Schepers =

German Catholic bishop (born 1953)

Ludger Schepers (born 18 April 1953) is a German prelate of the Catholic Church who has been an auxiliary bishop of Essen since 2008.

== Biography ==
Ledger Schepers was born on 18 April 1953 in the Osterfeld district of Oberhausen. He graduated from Novalis Gymnasium there and then entered the seminary of the diocese of Essen. He studied theology and philosophy at Ruhr University Bochum and the University of Freiburg. On 2 March 1979, he was ordained a priest by Bishop Franz Hengsbach.

Schepers worked as a chaplain in St. Boniface parish in Essen-Huttrop and Herz Jesu in Duisburg-Neumühl from 1979 to 1986. From 1986 to 1990 he was a youth pastor in Oberhausen and chaplain at St. Antony in Oberhausen-Alstaden. In August 1990, Schepers became pastor of the parish of St. Jude Thaddeus in Duisburg-Buchholz, into which other parishes were then merged. In 1994, he earned a licentiate in canon law at the University of Münster and in 1995 he became a diocesan judge. In 1999 he was named a member of the Priests' Council and the Church Tax Council of the Diocese of Essen. In 2002 he became dean of the Duisburg-Süd deanery. In 2006, after a reorganization of the parishes in the diocese of Essen, he became the first pastor of the newly founded large parish of St. Jude Thaddeus, which covers the area of the former Duisburg-Süd deanery.

On 27 June 2008, Pope Benedict XVI appointed him an auxiliary bishop of the diocese of Essen and titular bishop of Neapolis in Proconsulari. He received his episcopal consecration on 19 September 2008 in Essen Cathedral from Bishop Felix Genn and was named episcopal vicar for universal church and social tasks. He has been resident canon of the chapter of Essen Cathedral since 5 September 2008, with responsibility for church services and pastoral care.

In the German Bishops' Conference (DBK) he is a member of the Pastoral Commission, the Pastoral Commission's sub-group for Women in Church and Society, the World Church Commission, and the sub-commission for mission issues (especially MISSIO), of which he is chairman.

For several years he was the Pastoral Commission's Queer-Beauftragter or Representative to the Queer Community (Note: In German, the English word "queer" is used as "a collective term for people who are not heterosexual and for people whose gender identity does not conform to social ideas". (Queer ist ein Sammelbegriff für Menschen, die nicht heterosexuell sind sowie für Personen, deren geschlechtliche Identität nicht mit gesellschaftlichen Vorstellungen übereinstimmt.). See, for example, Queer Berlin Liaison Officer or the German government's appointment of a Queer-Beauftragter in 2022.) and has taken outspoken positions on the need for the Church to overhaul its views of sexual minority groups. In September 2022, after the German bishops at the general assembly of the Synodal Way failed to give the necessary two-thirds approval to a position paper on sexual ethics that 80% of the full assembly had endorsed, he criticized bishops who voted in the negative who had not contributed to the debate or raised no other objection than "tradition". He said: "If traditions are not alive, they are just dead letters that have already caused many crimes and... have caused a lot of suffering and continue to do so." He told an interviewer: "Diversity is creation and creation is good." In August 2023 he said he was proud that more than 20 dioceses had initiatives for pastoral care for the queer community and called for discussion of sexuality in relationships, not only in marriage. He also counseled patience and the need to work with the global church. He has also advocated the erection of a female diaconate, noting it has been discussed in Germany for fifty years.

In late February 2024, the DBK appointed Schepers to the new position of Beauftragte für queere Pastoral or Representative for Queer Pastoral Care, modifying his role from representing the Pastoral Commission to the gay community, giving him responsibility on behalf of the entire DBK, and transforming his mission from communications to coordinating pastoral outreach throughout the nation. In addressing his work leading a national effort for gay and lesbians he said: "The German Church could point out that the Bible does not condemn homosexuality in principle. It should be made clear that traditional values such as responsibility in a partnership and reliability are gender-neutral."
