= Spessart (disambiguation) =

Spessart is a range of low wooded mountains in Germany.

It may also refer to:

- Spessart, Rhineland-Palatinate, town in Germany
- Spessart (A1442), tanker of the German Navy
- 10951 Spessart, main-belt asteroid

== See also ==
- Gutsbezirk Spessart, unincorporated area in Germany
