= Priestless Catholic parishes =

Catholic parishes without resident priests

Priestless Catholic Parishes
- Formation: Varies by region
- Type: Catholic parish model
- Location: Worldwide

Priestless Catholic parishes are Catholic communities that function without a resident ordained priest. These parishes have become more common due to a growing shortage of priests, particularly in the Western world. Lay leaders and deacons often manage the daily activities of these parishes, conducting services such as the Liturgy of the Word, distributing the Eucharist using pre-consecrated hosts, and overseeing community activities.

== Background ==
The decline in priestly vocations has been an ongoing challenge for the Catholic Church, particularly in Europe and North America. Between 1970 and 2020, the number of priests in the United States dropped by 60%, leaving over 3,500 parishes without a resident pastor. This shortage has led to increasing reliance on visiting priests, missionary clergy from Africa and Asia, and lay ministers to sustain parish operations.

Pope Francis has addressed this issue by encouraging prayer and fostering vocations but has not supported a widespread change to clerical celibacy as a solution to the shortage.

== Structure and leadership ==
In priestless parishes, pastoral care is often provided by:

- Permanent deacons – ordained clergy who can officiate baptisms, weddings, and funerals.
- Lay ecclesial ministers – trained laypeople who lead prayer services and manage parish functions.
- Religious sisters and brothers – members of religious orders who serve in various ministries.
- Parish life coordinators – administrative figures appointed by the bishop to oversee parish activities.

These parishes rely on visiting priests to celebrate Mass periodically, but weekly liturgies are often led by deacons or lay leaders.

== Challenges ==
The priestless parish model presents several challenges:

- Sacramental limitations – Only a priest can consecrate the Eucharist and hear confessions.
- Community cohesion – The absence of a resident pastor can weaken parish unity.
- Pastoral care – Without a full-time priest, some parishioners may feel spiritually underserved.

Despite these difficulties, many parishes have adapted by emphasizing lay leadership, fostering local vocations, and increasing participation in communal prayer and service.

== See also ==
- Clerical celibacy in the Catholic Church
- Permanent diaconate
- Pastoral care
