= Weibern =

- Municipality
- Coat of arms

- Location of Weibern within Ahrweiler district
- Interactive map of Weibern
- Location within Germany Location within Rhineland-Palatinate
- Coordinates: 50°24′N 07°09′E
- Country: Germany
- State: Rhineland-Palatinate
- District: Ahrweiler
- Municipal assoc.: Brohltal

Government
  - Mayor (2019–24): Karl Gundert (CDU)

Area
  - Total: 10.56 km^{2} (4.08 sq mi)
- Elevation: 430 m (1,410 ft)

Population (2025-12-31)
  - Total: 1,501
  - Density: 142.1/km^{2} (368.1/sq mi)
- Time zone: UTC+01:00 (CET)
  - Summer (DST): UTC+02:00 (CEST)
- Postal codes: 56745
- Dialling codes: 02655
- Vehicle registration: AW
- Website: www.weibern.de

Weibern (German pronunciation: [ˈvaɪbɐn]) is a municipality in the district of Ahrweiler, in Rhineland-Palatinate, Germany.
