= Basilica of St. John the Baptist, Berlin =

Basilica of St. John the Baptist
- Basilika St. Johannes der Täufer Patron von Breslau
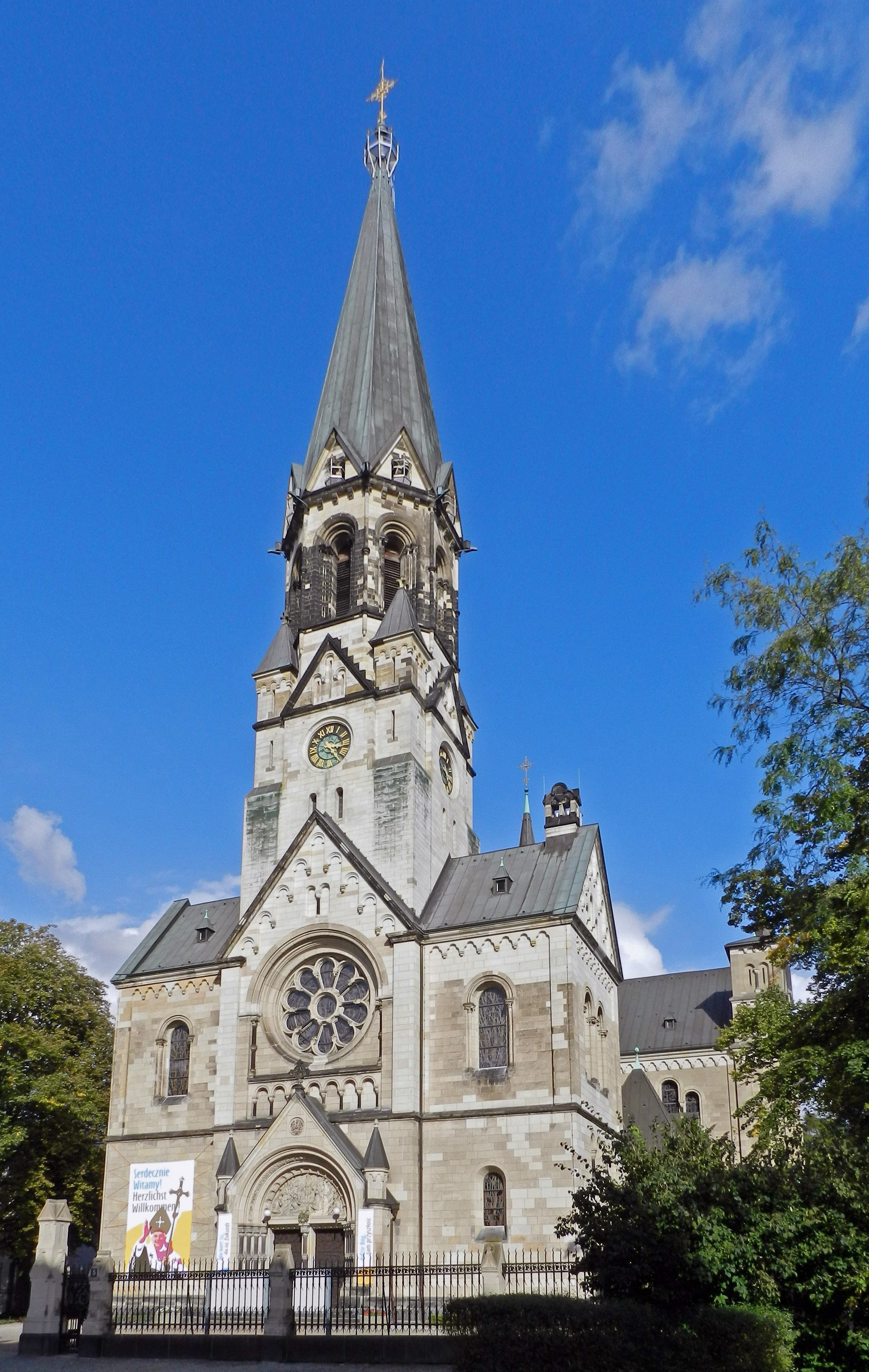

- 52°29′15″N 13°24′32″E
- Location: Neukölln, Neukölln, Berlin
- Country: Germany
- Denomination: Roman Catholicism

The Basilica of St. John the Baptist (German: Basilika St. Johannes der Täufer Patron von Breslau) also called Basilica of St. John the Baptist Patron of Breslavia is the Catholic cathedral seat of the Military Ordinariate of Germany. The church is located in the quarter of Neukölln in Berlin, next to the Holy See's Apostolic Nunciature.

The first stone of the basilica was placed in 1894. The architect of the project was August Menken, who had thought of the church as a basilica in the Romanesque style of the Rhine. The solemn inauguration of the church took place on May 8, 1897, in the presence of Emperor William II and Empress Augusta Victoria.

On December 3, 1906, Pope Pius X awarded the church the title of the Minor Basilica. From February 1, 2005, the church became the headquarters of the military regular of the Federal Government.

== See also ==
- Roman Catholicism in Germany
- St. John the Baptist

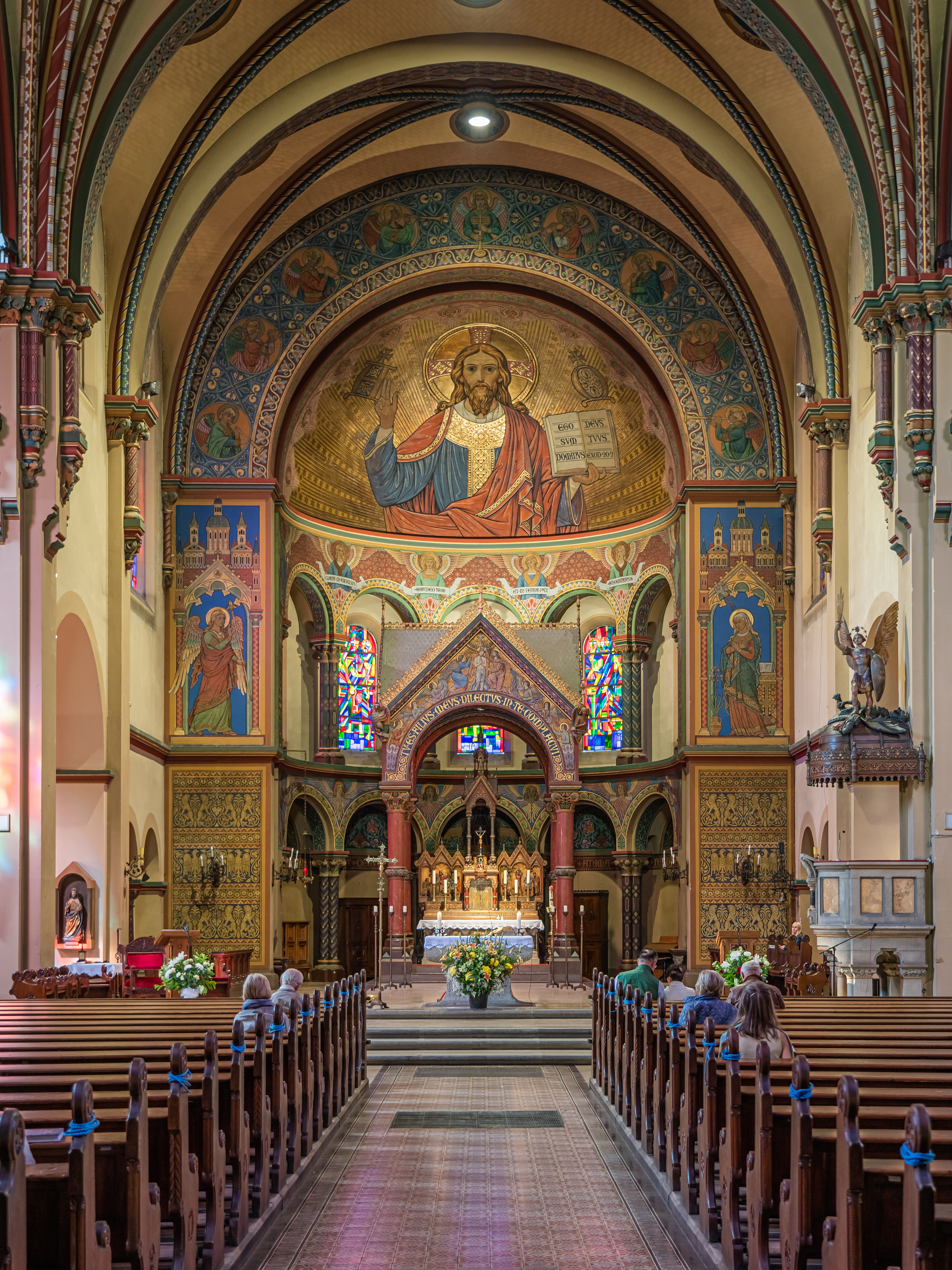
Interior view
