= Hohenleimbach =

- Municipality
- Coat of arms

- Location of Hohenleimbach within Ahrweiler district
- Interactive map of Hohenleimbach
- Location within Germany Location within Rhineland-Palatinate
- Coordinates: 50°24′41″N 7°3′37″E
- Country: Germany
- State: Rhineland-Palatinate
- District: Ahrweiler
- Municipal assoc.: Brohltal

Government
  - Mayor (2019–24): Thorsten Kurt Kabuth

Area
  - Total: 10.17 km^{2} (3.93 sq mi)
- Elevation: 512 m (1,680 ft)

Population (2025-12-31)
  - Total: 371
  - Density: 36.5/km^{2} (94.5/sq mi)
- Time zone: UTC+01:00 (CET)
  - Summer (DST): UTC+02:00 (CEST)
- Postal codes: 56746
- Dialling codes: 02655
- Vehicle registration: AW

Hohenleimbach is a municipality in the district of Ahrweiler, in Rhineland-Palatinate, Germany.

== History ==
The village was first mentioned in 1425 as a fief of a Peter von Thys named Leimbach. This original placename was in use until the begin of the 20th century. Since the 18th century the nickname Wüstleimbach showed up. The prefix "Wüst" means "deserted" in the sense of lost or abandoned. Due to the barren fields and the severe poverty of the inhabitants they decided to emigrate mainly to America leaving their farms behind which were abandoned afterwards. The population of the largely abandoned village decreased below 100 in the 17th and 18th centuries. According to a resolution of the local borough council in 1914, the village was allowed, by an imperial decree of 31 January 1916, to rename itself Hohenleimbach, because of the negative image of the nickname Wüstleimbach ("deserted Leimbach"). The small village Lederbach one mile in the north is part of the municipality. Centuries ago there was another little village named Rembach and situated in the south of Hohenleimbach at the mouth of the Lederbach ("Leatherbrook") running into the Nette rivulet, consisting of only four farms. First mentioned in 1337 it had to be already abandoned in the 17th century due to poverty.

=== Inhabitants ===
Number of inhabitants (31 December)

Year	Pop.	±%
1815	152	—
1835	188	+23.7%
1871	159	−15.4%
1905	231	+45.3%
1939	260	+12.6%
1950	264	+1.5%
1961	284	+7.6%
1965	321	+13.0%
1970	302	−5.9%

Year	Pop.	±%
1975	301	−0.3%
1980	286	−5.0%
1985	253	−11.5%
1987	277	+9.5%
1990	292	+5.4%
1995	335	+14.7%
2000	359	+7.2%
2005	371	+3.3%
2019	360	−3.0%

Source: Statistisches Landesamt Rheinland-Pfalz
