= Brenk =

- Municipality
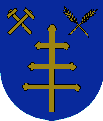
- Coat of arms

- Location of Brenk within Ahrweiler district
- Interactive map of Brenk
- Location within Germany Location within Rhineland-Palatinate
- Coordinates: 50°25′55″N 7°10′21″E
- Country: Germany
- State: Rhineland-Palatinate
- District: Ahrweiler
- Municipal assoc.: Brohltal

Government
  - Mayor (2019–24): Christoph Stenz

Area
  - Total: 3.09 km^{2} (1.19 sq mi)
- Elevation: 350 m (1,150 ft)

Population (2025-12-31)
  - Total: 189
  - Density: 61.2/km^{2} (158/sq mi)
- Time zone: UTC+01:00 (CET)
  - Summer (DST): UTC+02:00 (CEST)
- Postal codes: 56651
- Dialling codes: 02655
- Vehicle registration: AW

Brenk (German pronunciation: [bʁɛŋk]) is a municipality in the district of Ahrweiler, in Rhineland-Palatinate, Germany.
