= Children of the ordained =

Term used by the Catholic Church

Children of the ordained is a term the Vatican uses to describe the offspring of ordained Catholic priests who have taken a vow of clerical celibacy. The children are a "result of affairs involving priests and laywomen or nuns – others of abuse or rape". Not many of these children are known, but the most famous is probably Vincent Doyle, who has started a support group, Coping International.

In 2009, the Vatican under Pope Benedict XVI and Cardinal Cláudio Hummes composed guidelines for the children of priests. The official name of the document is "Congregazione per il Clero a proposito dei chierici con prole" (Notes concerning the practice of the Congregation for the Clergy with regard to clerics with children). The New York Times reported on the guidelines' existence in 2019. The guidelines were considered as a "secret". In 2020, the Congregation for Clergy released the guidelines to Vincent Doyle. They include two exceptions which allows priests to remain in the Catholic priesthood, having fathered a child, and openly acknowledged their child.

== See also ==
- List of children of clergy
