= Burgbrohl =

- Municipality
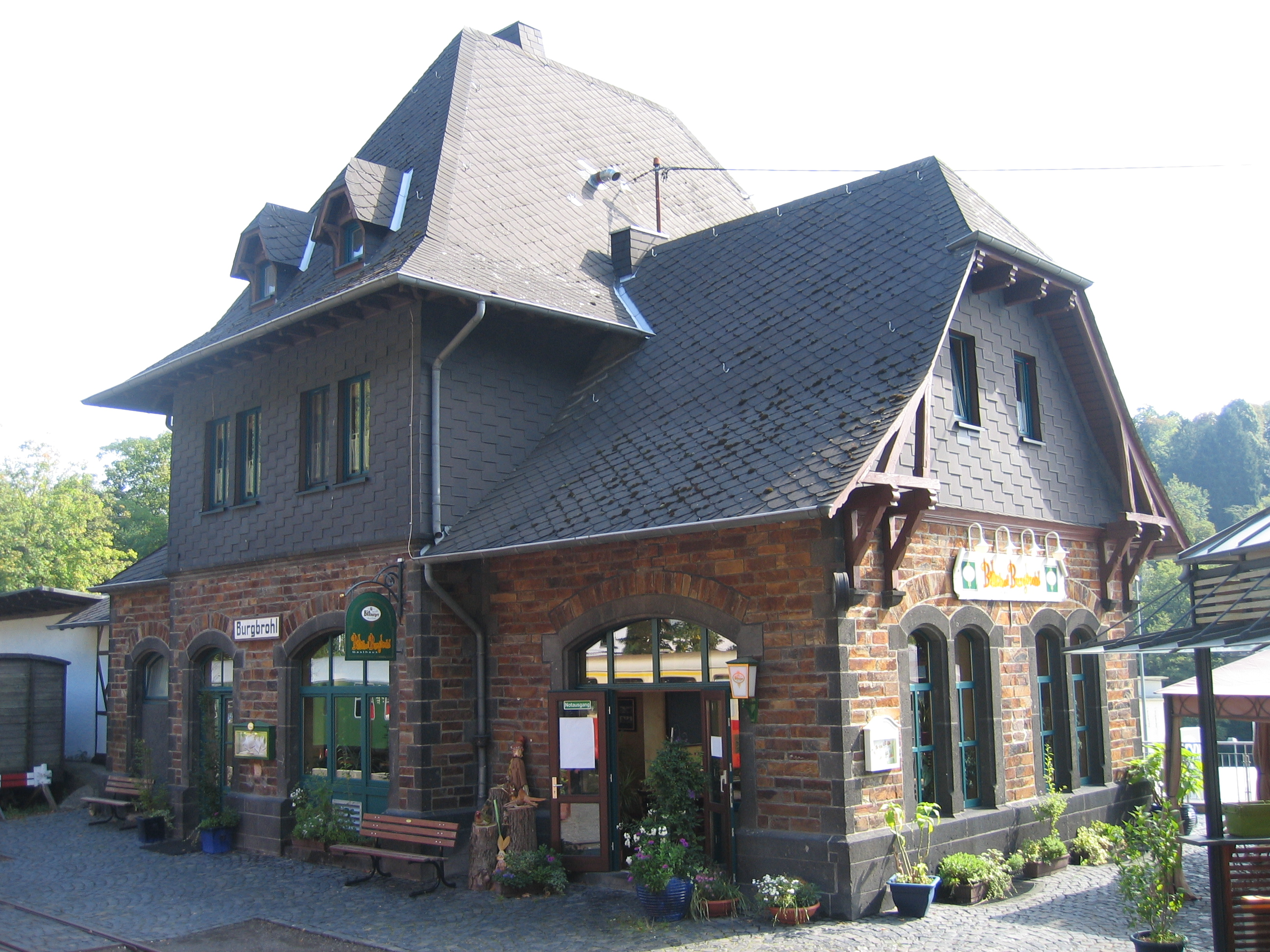
- Train station

- Coat of arms

- Location of Burgbrohl within Ahrweiler district
- Interactive map of Burgbrohl
- Location within Germany Location within Rhineland-Palatinate
- Coordinates: 50°27′32″N 7°16′44″E
- Country: Germany
- State: Rhineland-Palatinate
- District: Ahrweiler
- Municipal assoc.: Brohltal

Government
  - Mayor (2024–29): Simone Schneider

Area
  - Total: 10.62 km^{2} (4.10 sq mi)
- Elevation: 152 m (499 ft)

Population (2025-12-31)
  - Total: 3,264
  - Density: 307.3/km^{2} (796.0/sq mi)
- Time zone: UTC+01:00 (CET)
  - Summer (DST): UTC+02:00 (CEST)
- Postal codes: 56659
- Dialling codes: 02636
- Vehicle registration: AW
- Website: www.burgbrohl.de

Burgbrohl is a municipality in the district of Ahrweiler, in Rhineland-Palatinate, Germany.

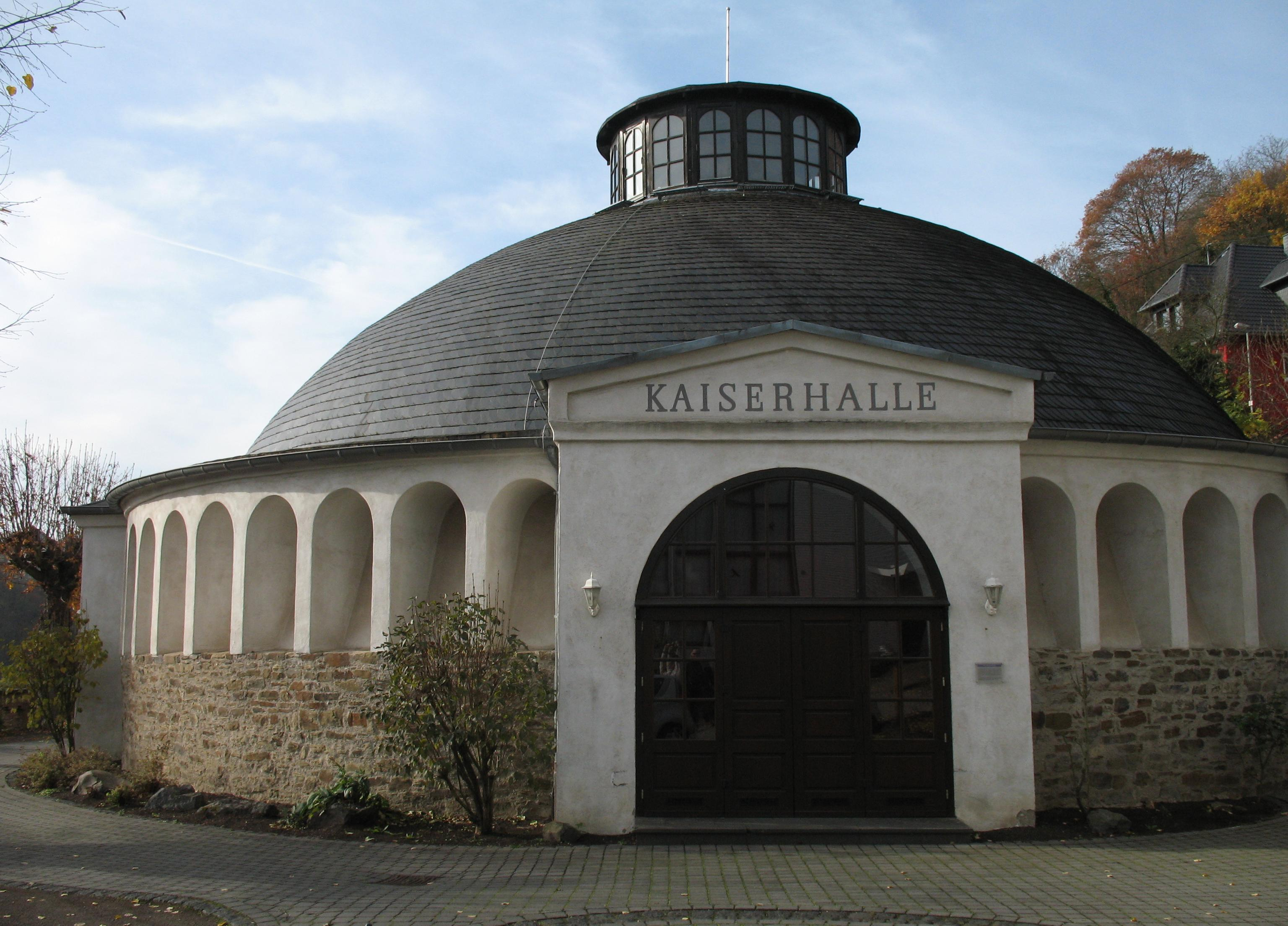
„Kaiserhalle“

== People ==
- Felix Genn (born 1950), Roman Catholic bishop of Münster, born in Burgbrohl
