= Dedenbach =

- Municipality
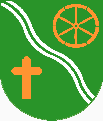
- Coat of arms

- Location of Dedenbach within Ahrweiler district
- Interactive map of Dedenbach
- Location within Germany Location within Rhineland-Palatinate
- Coordinates: 50°29′03″N 7°10′36″E
- Country: Germany
- State: Rhineland-Palatinate
- District: Ahrweiler
- Municipal assoc.: Brohltal

Government
  - Mayor (2019–24): Michael Freund

Area
  - Total: 7.65 km^{2} (2.95 sq mi)
- Elevation: 272 m (892 ft)

Population (2025-12-31)
  - Total: 482
  - Density: 63.0/km^{2} (163/sq mi)
- Time zone: UTC+01:00 (CET)
  - Summer (DST): UTC+02:00 (CEST)
- Postal codes: 53426
- Dialling codes: 02646
- Vehicle registration: AW
- Website: www.gemeinde-dedenbach.de

Dedenbach is a municipality in the district of Ahrweiler, in Rhineland-Palatinate, Germany.
