= Galenberg =

- Municipality
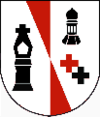
- Coat of arms

- Location of Galenberg within Ahrweiler district
- Interactive map of Galenberg
- Location within Germany Location within Rhineland-Palatinate
- Coordinates: 50°26′24″N 7°11′26″E
- Country: Germany
- State: Rhineland-Palatinate
- District: Ahrweiler
- Municipal assoc.: Brohltal

Government
  - Mayor (2019–24): Reinhold Schmitz

Area
  - Total: 2.28 km^{2} (0.88 sq mi)
- Elevation: 345 m (1,132 ft)

Population (2025-12-31)
  - Total: 231
  - Density: 101/km^{2} (262/sq mi)
- Time zone: UTC+01:00 (CET)
  - Summer (DST): UTC+02:00 (CEST)
- Postal codes: 56651
- Dialling codes: 02655
- Vehicle registration: AW

Galenberg is a municipality in the district of Ahrweiler, in Rhineland-Palatinate, Germany.
