= Glees, Germany =

- Municipality
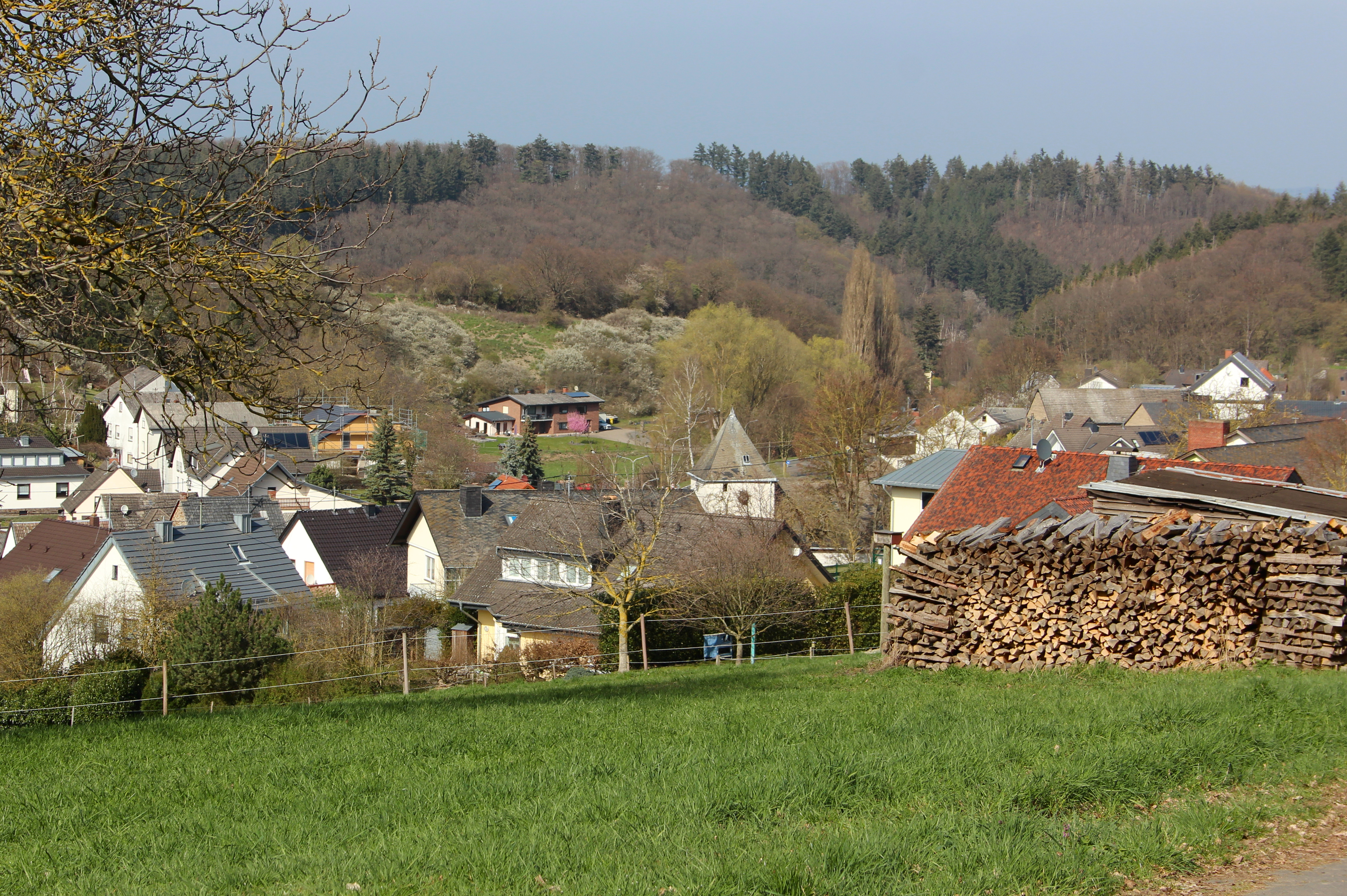

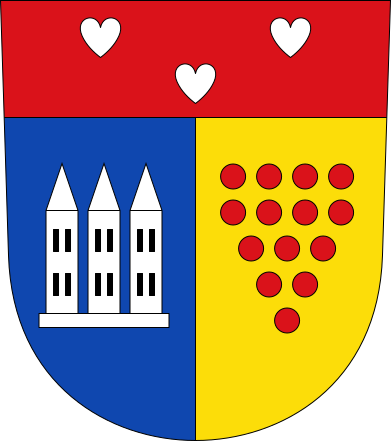
- Coat of arms

- Location of Glees, Germany within Ahrweiler district
- Interactive map of Glees, Germany
- Location within Germany Location within Rhineland-Palatinate
- Coordinates: 50°26′00″N 7°14′38″E
- Country: Germany
- State: Rhineland-Palatinate
- District: Ahrweiler
- Municipal assoc.: Brohltal

Government
  - Mayor (2019–24): Manfred Hürter

Area
  - Total: 11.46 km^{2} (4.42 sq mi)
- Elevation: 284 m (932 ft)

Population (2025-12-31)
  - Total: 588
  - Density: 51.3/km^{2} (133/sq mi)
- Time zone: UTC+01:00 (CET)
  - Summer (DST): UTC+02:00 (CEST)
- Postal codes: 56653
- Dialling codes: 02636
- Vehicle registration: AW

Glees is a municipality in the district of Ahrweiler, in Rhineland-Palatinate, Germany. It lies near the Maria Laach Abbey.
