= Niederdürenbach =

- Municipality
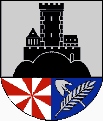
- Coat of arms

- Location of Niederdürenbach within Ahrweiler district
- Interactive map of Niederdürenbach
- Location within Germany Location within Rhineland-Palatinate
- Coordinates: 50°27′24″N 7°10′59″E
- Country: Germany
- State: Rhineland-Palatinate
- District: Ahrweiler
- Municipal assoc.: Brohltal
- Subdivisions: 2

Government
  - Mayor (2019–24): Sebastian Schmitt

Area
  - Total: 6.82 km^{2} (2.63 sq mi)
- Elevation: 312 m (1,024 ft)

Population (2025-12-31)
  - Total: 941
  - Density: 138/km^{2} (357/sq mi)
- Time zone: UTC+01:00 (CET)
  - Summer (DST): UTC+02:00 (CEST)
- Postal codes: 56651
- Dialling codes: 02636
- Vehicle registration: AW

Niederdürenbach is a municipality in the district of Ahrweiler, in Rhineland-Palatinate, Germany.
