= Joseph Wendel =

German Cardinal (1901–1960)

His Eminence Joseph Wendel
- Cardinal, Archbishop of Munich and Freising
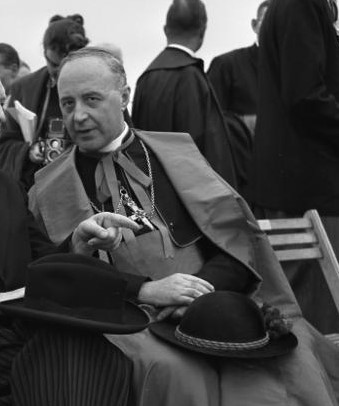
- Joseph Wendel at the final rally of the 77th Deutscher Katholikentag (German Catholic Day) in Cologne, 1956.
- Archdiocese: Munich and Freising
- See: Munich and Freising
- Appointed: 9 August 1952
- Installed: 7 November 1952
- Term ended: 31 December 1960
- Predecessor: Michael von Faulhaber
- Successor: Julius August Döpfner
- Other posts: Cardinal-Priest of Santa Maria Nuova; Bishop of Military Ordinariate of Germany
- Previous posts: Coadjutor Bishop of Speyer (1941–1943); Titular Bishop of Lebessus (1941–1943); Bishop of Speyer (1943–1952)

Orders
- Ordination: 30 October 1927 by Basilio Pompili
- Consecration: 29 June 1941 by Ludwig Sebastian
- Created cardinal: 12 January 1953
- Rank: Cardinal-Priest

Personal details
- Born: 27 May 1901 Blieskastel, Palatinate, Bavaria, German Empire
- Died: 31 December 1960 (aged 59) Munich, Bavaria, West Germany
- Denomination: Roman Catholic
- Motto: veritati et caritati
- Coat of arms

Styles of Joseph Wendel
- Reference style: His Eminence
- Spoken style: Your Eminence
- Religious style: Monsignor
- Informal style: Cardinal
- See: Munich and Freising

Joseph Wendel (27 May 1901 – 31 December 1960) was a German Cardinal of the Roman Catholic Church who served as Archbishop of Munich and Freising from 1952 until his death, and was elevated to the cardinalate in 1953 by Pope Pius XII.

== Biography ==
Joseph Wendel was born in Blieskastel, and studied at the seminary in Speyer, and the Pontifical German-Hungarian College and the Pontifical Gregorian University in Rome. From the Gregorian he obtained doctorates in philosophy and theology. Wendel was ordained to the priesthood on 30 October 1927, and then did pastoral work in Speyer, also serving as director of Caritas, until 1941.

On 4 April 1941 he was appointed Coadjutor Bishop of Speyer and Titular Bishop of Lebessus. He received his episcopal consecration on the following 29 June from Bishop Ludwig Sebastian, with Bishops Matthias Ehrenfried and Joseph Kolb serving as co-consecrators. Wendel succeeded Sebastian as Bishop of Speyer on 20 May 1943, being installed on 4 June that year. During World War II, he strongly defended the rights of the Church and humanity. Wendel became known as the "Bishop of Peace" following the war because of his efforts to restore West Germany's good will

Pope Pius XII named him Archbishop of Munich and Freising on 9 August 1952 (three Bishops of Speyer have become Archbishop of Munich and Freising, the others being Michael von Faulhaber and Friedrich Wetter), and created him Cardinal Priest of S. Maria Nuova in the consistory of 12 January 1953. On 4 February 1956, Wendel became the Apostolic Vicar of the Catholic Military Ordinariate of Germany. He was one of the cardinal electors in the 1958 papal conclave, which selected Pope John XXIII. The German prelate also made gestures of ecumenism to Protestants, and organized the International Eucharistic Congress in Munich in 1960.

Shortly after delivering his New Year's Eve sermon, Wendel died from a heart attack in Munich, at age 59. He is buried in the metropolitan cathedral of that city.

Catholic Church titles
Preceded by Ludwig Sebastian	Bishop of Speyer; 1943–1952	Succeeded by Isidor Emanuel
Preceded by Michael von Faulhaber	Archbishop of Munich and Freising; 1952–1960	Succeeded by Julius Döpfner
Vacant Title last held by Franz Josef Rarkowski (1945)	Military vicar of Germany (West); 1956–1960	Succeeded by Franz Hengsbach
