= Brohltal =

- Verbandsgemeinde
- Coat of arms

- Location of Brohltal within Landkreis Ahrweiler district
- Interactive map of Brohltal
- Location within Germany Location within Rhineland-Palatinate
- Coordinates: 50°27′28″N 7°12′59″E
- Country: Germany
- State: Rhineland-Palatinate
- District: Landkreis Ahrweiler
- Subdivisions: 17 Gemeinden

Government
  - Mayor (2023–31): Johannes Bell

Area
  - Total: 138.44 km^{2} (53.45 sq mi)

Population (2025-12-31)
  - Total: 18,813
  - Density: 135.89/km^{2} (351.96/sq mi)
- Time zone: UTC+01:00 (CET)
  - Summer (DST): UTC+02:00 (CEST)
- Vehicle registration: AW
- Website: brohltal-verwaltung.de

Brohltal is a Verbandsgemeinde ("collective municipality") in the district of Ahrweiler, in Rhineland-Palatinate, Germany. It is situated approximately 30 km north-west of Koblenz. The seat of the municipality is in Niederzissen.

The Verbandsgemeinde Brohltal consists of the following Ortsgemeinden ("local municipalities"):

Municipality	Area (km^{2})	Population
Brenk	3.08	189
Burgbrohl	10.62	3264
Dedenbach	7.63	482
Galenberg	2.28	231
Glees	11.45	588
Hohenleimbach	10.17	371
Kempenich	11.91	1874
Königsfeld	7.20	765
Niederdürenbach	6.82	941
Niederzissen *	11.95	2754
Oberdürenbach	6.94	661
Oberzissen	2.73	1083
Schalkenbach	10.29	794
Spessart	8.72	851
Wassenach	6.16	1305
Wehr	9.93	1159
Weibern	10.56	1501
Verbandsgemeinde Brohltal	138.44	18813

^{*} seat of the Verbandsgemeinde
