= Oberdürenbach =

- Municipality
- Location of Oberdürenbach within Ahrweiler district
- Interactive map of Oberdürenbach
- Location within Germany Location within Rhineland-Palatinate
- Coordinates: 50°28′6″N 7°9′32″E
- Country: Germany
- State: Rhineland-Palatinate
- District: Ahrweiler
- Municipal assoc.: Brohltal

Government
  - Mayor (2019–24): Elisabeth Dahr

Area
  - Total: 6.94 km^{2} (2.68 sq mi)
- Elevation: 308 m (1,010 ft)

Population (2025-12-31)
  - Total: 661
  - Density: 95.2/km^{2} (247/sq mi)
- Time zone: UTC+01:00 (CET)
  - Summer (DST): UTC+02:00 (CEST)
- Postal codes: 56651
- Dialling codes: 02646
- Vehicle registration: AW
- Website: www.oberduerenbach.de

Oberdürenbach is a municipality in the district of Ahrweiler, in Rhineland-Palatinate, Germany.
