= Wehr, Rhineland-Palatinate =

Wehr
- Municipality
- Coat of arms

- Location of Wehr within Ahrweiler district
- Interactive map of Wehr
- Location within Germany Location within Rhineland-Palatinate
- Coordinates: 50°25′18.85″N 7°12′39.79″E
- Country: Germany
- State: Rhineland-Palatinate
- District: Ahrweiler
- Municipal assoc.: Brohltal

Government
  - Mayor (2024–29): Andy Paulissen

Area
  - Total: 9.94 km^{2} (3.84 sq mi)
- Elevation: 308 m (1,010 ft)

Population (2025-12-31)
  - Total: 1,159
  - Density: 117/km^{2} (302/sq mi)
- Time zone: UTC+01:00 (CET)
  - Summer (DST): UTC+02:00 (CEST)
- Postal codes: 56653
- Dialling codes: 02636
- Vehicle registration: AW

Wehr (German pronunciation: [veːɐ̯]) is a municipality in the district of Ahrweiler, in Rhineland-Palatinate, Germany. Wehr is a small village off Bundesautobahn 61. It lies next to the Laacher See.

== People ==
- Stefan Bell (born 1991), German footballer, grew up in Wehr
