= Franz Justus Rarkowski =

German Catholic military bishop

The Most Reverend Franz Justus Rarkowski, S.M.
- Field Bishop of the German Army
- See: Military Vicariate of Germany
- Appointed: January 7, 1938
- Term ended: February 1, 1945
- Predecessor: Heinrich Joeppen
- Successor: Joseph Wendel
- Other post: Titular Bishop of Hierocaesarea

Orders
- Ordination: January 9, 1898
- Consecration: February 20, 1938 by Cesare Orsenigo

Personal details
- Born: June 8, 1873 Allenstein, East Prussia, Kingdom of Prussia, German Empire (today Olsztyn, Poland)
- Died: February 9, 1950 (aged 76) Munich, Bavaria, West Germany
- Denomination: Roman Catholic

Franz Justus Rarkowski, S.M. (June 8, 1873 – February 9, 1950) was the Catholic military bishop of Nazi Germany. The existence of such a role was provided for by the Reichskonkordat (1933), and Rarkowski had been acting head of the military chaplaincy since 1929, before he was officially consecrated on February 29, 1938, as episcopus castrensis. Rarkowski's title was translated into English as "Field Bishop of the German Army".

The first draft of the Apostolic Brief to regulate the military chaplaincy was given to the German government on June 26, 1934. The brief was issued on September 19, 1935.

== Biography ==
Rarkowski was born in Allenstein, East Prussia (today Olsztyn, Poland). He was a former associate of President Paul von Hindenburg, and Ambassador Diego von Bergen was informed in July 1935 that he was the favored candidate of the Nazi Party. Rarkowski had not graduated from high school, but was admitted to study theology for the priesthood in Switzerland, where he left his religious order. According to historian Guenter Lewy, the German bishops' opposition to Rarkowski's candidacy "stemmed from the episcopate's feeling that he was their inferior and a threat to their status rather than from the unacceptability of his political ideas". Nuncio Cesare Orsenigo argued that Rarkowski, at 62, was too old for the post, but raised no other objections. Rarkowski was named acting army bishop in August 1936. He was consecrated by Orsenigo, assisted by Konrad von Preysing and Clemens August Graf von Galen.

The Catholic bishops in Nazi Germany had long opposed the existence of such a role, while Hitler's government demanded that the military chaplaincy be exempt from the episcopal jurisdiction of the diocesan bishops. Once the hierarchy consented to Rarkowski's consecration, he was excluded from the meetings of the Fulda Conference except when military matters were discussed. His office was in the defense ministry in Berlin.

Rarkowski was a public and vocal supporter of the Nazi regime, known especially for his nationalistic and militaristic speeches and writings. On the eve of the 1939 invasion of Poland, Rarkowski told soldiers: "Comrades, the issue is your homeland and your people! Be manly and strong!". In an October 4, 1940, pastoral letter, Rarkowski argued that Germany was "waging a just war" and praised German Catholic soldiers for the "Christian attitude they have maintained on the field of battle". Rarkowski continued:

"The German Nation has a great duty to fulfill in the face of the Eternal Almighty. Abroad and at home the Fuehrer has thanked God that his plea for His blessing for our good and just cause was expressed more than once, and was understood. Certainly, other nations opposed to us pray to God and beg Him to grant them victory. God is, in the same manner, Father of all nations, but He is not, in the same manner, arbiter of justice and injustice, of honesty and mendacity. From reports of field chaplains who were with you on all fronts during the past year, I was able to observe how naturally and joyfully you participated in religious services and received the sacraments, not only immediately before battle, but also in the many months when the fronts were quiet. Your Christian faith was everywhere where you, as soldiers, often had to achieve the superhuman, and was a valuable part of your spiritual and moral equipment."

Rarkowski blamed Jews for the war in a Christmas message to Catholic soldiers in 1940.

There were 560 Catholic military chaplains in Nazi Germany at the outbreak of World War II. Hermann Göring had forbidden such chaplains in the air force, but the other branches of the military were generally supportive of the institution.

After the remilitarisation of West Germany in 1955, when the military vicarate was re-established, it was independent of the army authorities; Pius XII appointed Cardinal Josef Wendel of Munich as new military ordinariate for West Germany. In communist East Germany there was no established military chaplaincy.

== Notes ==
Catholic Church titles
Vacant Title last held by Heinrich Joeppen (1918)	Field Bishop of the German Army; 1938 – 1945	Vacant Title next held by Josef Wendel (1956)
Preceded by John Marie Laval	Titular Bishop of Hierocaesarea; 1938 – 1950	Succeeded by Timothy Phelim O'Shea
