= Military Ordinariate of Germany =

Latin Catholic jurisdiction in Germany

Coordinates: 52.4875°N 13.4086°E

Military Ordinariate of Germany Katholische Militärseelsorge

Catholic
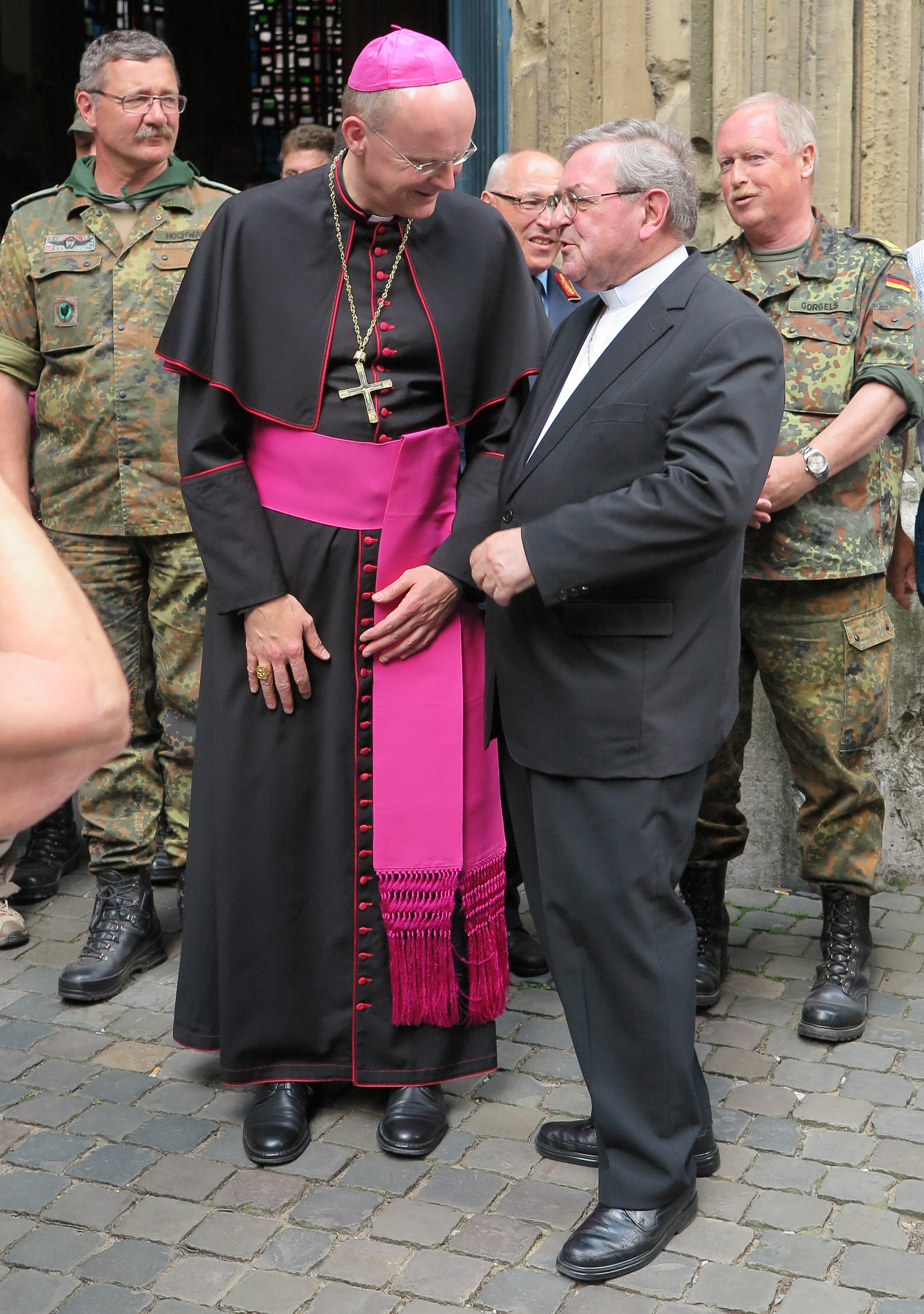
- Franz-Josef Overbeck (2014)

Location
- Country: Germany

Information
- Denomination: Catholic Church
- Sui iuris church: Latin Church
- Rite: Roman Rite
- Established: 22 May 1868 (158 years ago)

Current leadership
- Pope: Leo XIV
- Bishop: Franz-Josef Overbeck
- Bishops emeritus: Walter Mixa

Website
- www.kmba.militaerseelsorge.bundeswehr.de

The Military Ordinariate of Germany (German: Katholische Militärseelsorge; Deutsches Militärordinariat) is a military ordinariate of the Catholic Church. Immediately subject to the Holy See, it provides pastoral care to Roman Catholics serving in the German Armed Forces and their families.

Franz-Josef Overbeck, who was appointed Bishop of the Roman Catholic Diocese of Essen by Pope Benedict XVI in 2009, was also appointed Military Ordinary for Germany on 24 February 2011.

== History ==
The first military bishop was appointment on 22 May 1868. A military vicariate was established on 20 July 1933, but it was not until 7 January 1938 that the first military vicar was appointed. It was elevated to a military ordinariate 21 July 1986. The Episcopal seat is located at the Basilica of St. John the Baptist Patron of Breslavia (Basilika St. Johannes der Täufer Patron von Breslau) in Berlin, Germany.

== Past and present ordinaries ==
- Franz Adolf Namszanowski (appointed on 22 May 1868 – resigned on 28 May 1872)
- Vacant (1872–1888)
- Johann Baptist Assmann (appointed on 1 June 1888 – died in office on 27 May 1903)
- Heinrich Vollmar (appointed on 9 November 1903 – resigned in 1913)
- Heinrich Joeppen (appointed on 27 October 1913 – resigned on 9 November 1918)
- Vacant (1918–1938)
- Franz Justus Rarkowski, S.M. (appointed on 7 January 1938 – resigned on 1 February 1945)
- Vacant (1945–1956)
- Joseph Wendel (appointed on 4 February 1956 – died in office on 31 December 1960)
- Franz Hengsbach (appointed on 10 October 1961 – resigned on 22 May 1978)
- Elmar Maria Kredel (appointed on 22 May 1978 – resigned on 30 November 1990)
- Johannes Dyba (appointed on 30 November 1990 – died in office on 23 July 2000)
- Walter Mixa (appointed on 31 August 2000 – resigned on 21 April 2010)
- Franz-Josef Overbeck (appointed on 24 February 2011 – present)
