= Oberzissen =

- Municipality
- Coat of arms

- Location of Oberzissen within Ahrweiler district
- Interactive map of Oberzissen
- Location within Germany Location within Rhineland-Palatinate
- Coordinates: 50°27′12″N 7°11′51″E
- Country: Germany
- State: Rhineland-Palatinate
- District: Ahrweiler
- Municipal assoc.: Brohltal

Government
  - Mayor (2019–24): Christof Bürger

Area
  - Total: 2.73 km^{2} (1.05 sq mi)
- Elevation: 238 m (781 ft)

Population (2025-12-31)
  - Total: 1,083
  - Density: 397/km^{2} (1,030/sq mi)
- Time zone: UTC+01:00 (CET)
  - Summer (DST): UTC+02:00 (CEST)
- Postal codes: 56651
- Dialling codes: 02636
- Vehicle registration: AW
- Website: brohltal-verwaltung.de

Oberzissen is a municipality in the district of Ahrweiler, in Rhineland-Palatinate, Germany.
