= Königsfeld, Rhineland-Palatinate =

Königsfeld
- Municipality
- Coat of arms

- Location of Königsfeld within Ahrweiler district
- Interactive map of Königsfeld
- Location within Germany Location within Rhineland-Palatinate
- Coordinates: 50°29′55″N 7°10′35″E
- Country: Germany
- State: Rhineland-Palatinate
- District: Ahrweiler
- Municipal assoc.: Brohltal

Government
  - Mayor (2019–24): Werner Breuer

Area
  - Total: 7.2 km^{2} (2.8 sq mi)
- Elevation: 272 m (892 ft)

Population (2025-12-31)
  - Total: 765
  - Density: 110/km^{2} (280/sq mi)
- Time zone: UTC+01:00 (CET)
  - Summer (DST): UTC+02:00 (CEST)
- Postal codes: 53426
- Dialling codes: 02646
- Vehicle registration: AW

Königsfeld (German pronunciation: [ˈkøːnɪçsˌfɛlt]) is a municipality in the district of Ahrweiler, in Rhineland-Palatinate, Germany. It is located in Ahrweiler.

== Geography ==
Königsfeld is situated in the Vinxtbach valley within the Eifel region. The municipal area includes the outlying settlements of Landgut Leyerhof and Ölmühle.
