= Wassenach =

- Municipality
- Coat of arms

- Location of Wassenach within Ahrweiler district
- Interactive map of Wassenach
- Location within Germany Location within Rhineland-Palatinate
- Coordinates: 50°25′59″N 7°16′45″E
- Country: Germany
- State: Rhineland-Palatinate
- District: Ahrweiler
- Municipal assoc.: Brohltal

Government
  - Mayor (2019–24): Manfred Sattler (CDU)

Area
  - Total: 6.16 km^{2} (2.38 sq mi)
- Elevation: 288 m (945 ft)

Population (2025-12-31)
  - Total: 1,305
  - Density: 212/km^{2} (549/sq mi)
- Time zone: UTC+01:00 (CET)
  - Summer (DST): UTC+02:00 (CEST)
- Postal codes: 56653
- Dialling codes: 02636
- Vehicle registration: AW
- Website: www.wassenach.de

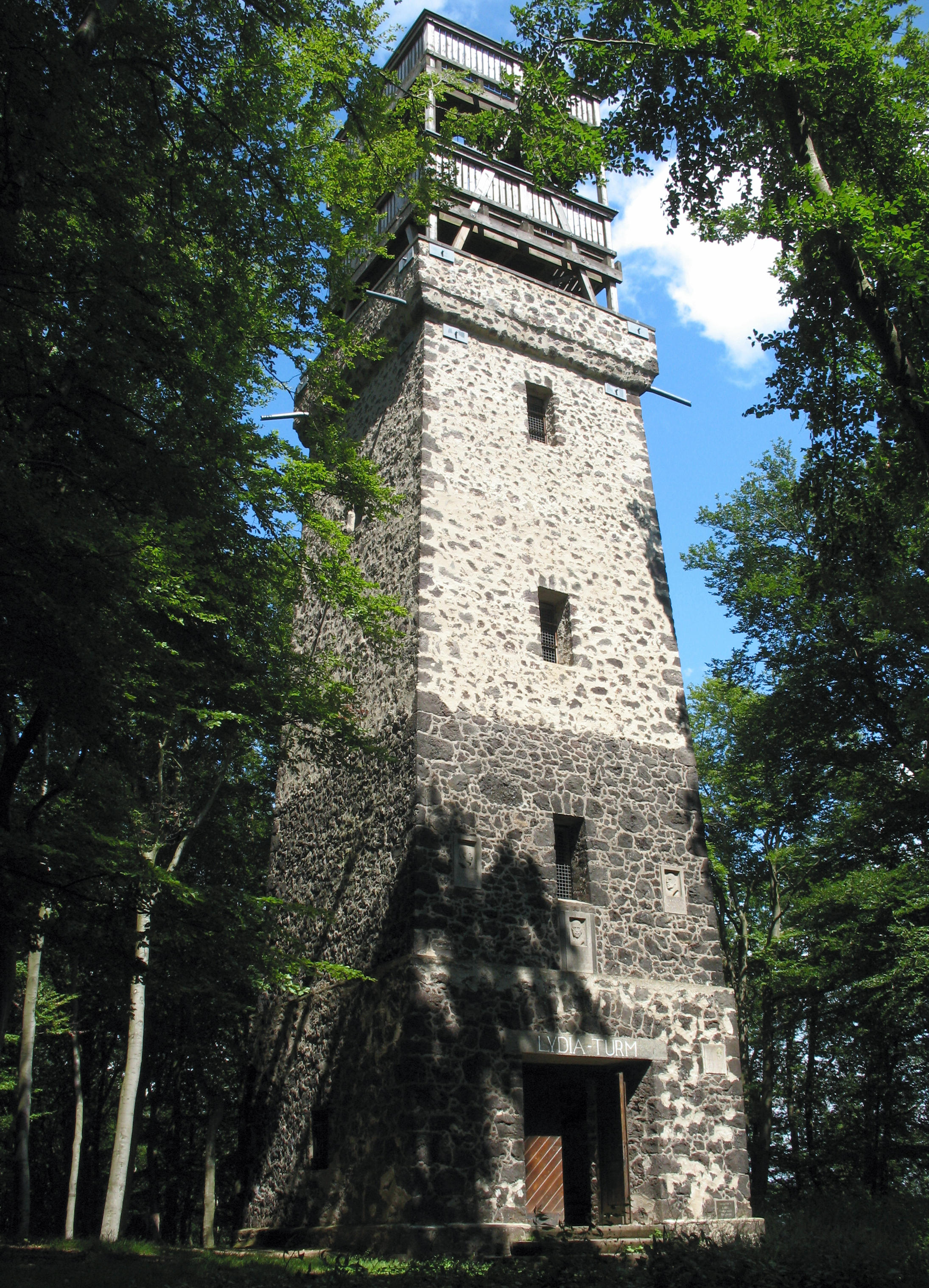
Lydia tower

Wassenach is a municipality in the district of Ahrweiler, in Rhineland-Palatinate, Germany.
