= Reinhard Lettmann =

Roman Catholic bishop

His Excellency Reinhard Lettmann
- Bishop of Münster
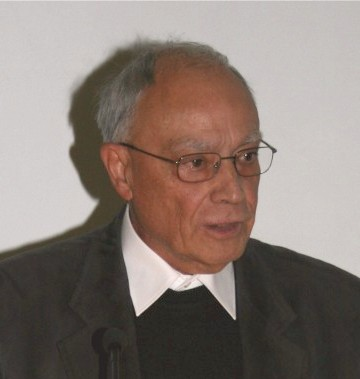
- Bishop Reinhard Lettmann
- Diocese: Münster
- See: Münster
- Appointed: 11 January 1980
- Installed: 16 March 1980
- Term ended: 28 March 2008
- Predecessor: Heinrich Tenhumberg
- Successor: Felix Genn
- Previous posts: Auxiliary Bishop of Münster (1973-1980); Titular Bishop of Rotaria (1973-1980)

Orders
- Ordination: 21 February 1959 by Michael Keller
- Consecration: 24 February 1973 by Heinrich Tenhumberg

Personal details
- Born: 9 March 1933 Datteln, Germany
- Died: 16 April 2013 (aged 80) Bethlehem, State of Palestine
- Denomination: Roman Catholic
- Coat of arms

Reinhard Lettmann (9 March 1933 – 16 April 2013) was the Roman Catholic bishop of the Diocese of Münster, Germany.

Ordained to the priesthood in 1959, Lettmann was named bishop in 1973 and retired in 2008.

Catholic Church titles
Preceded by Heinrich Tenhumberg	Bishop of Münster; 1980-2008	Succeeded by Felix Genn
