= Spessart, Rhineland-Palatinate =

Spessart
- Municipality
- Coat of arms

- Location of Spessart within Ahrweiler district
- Interactive map of Spessart
- Location within Germany Location within Rhineland-Palatinate
- Coordinates: 50°26′23″N 7°6′37″E
- Country: Germany
- State: Rhineland-Palatinate
- District: Ahrweiler
- Municipal assoc.: Brohltal
- Subdivisions: 3

Government
  - Mayor (2019–24): Frank Klapperich

Area
  - Total: 8.72 km^{2} (3.37 sq mi)
- Elevation: 500 m (1,600 ft)

Population (2025-12-31)
  - Total: 851
  - Density: 97.6/km^{2} (253/sq mi)
- Time zone: UTC+01:00 (CET)
  - Summer (DST): UTC+02:00 (CEST)
- Postal codes: 56746
- Dialling codes: 02655
- Vehicle registration: AW
- Website: www.spessart-brohltal.de

Spessart (German pronunciation: [ˈʃpɛsaʁt]) is a municipality in the district of Ahrweiler, in Rhineland-Palatinate, Germany.
