= Felix Genn =

German bishop and theologian

His Excellency, The Most Reverend Felix Genn
- Bishop emeritus of Münster
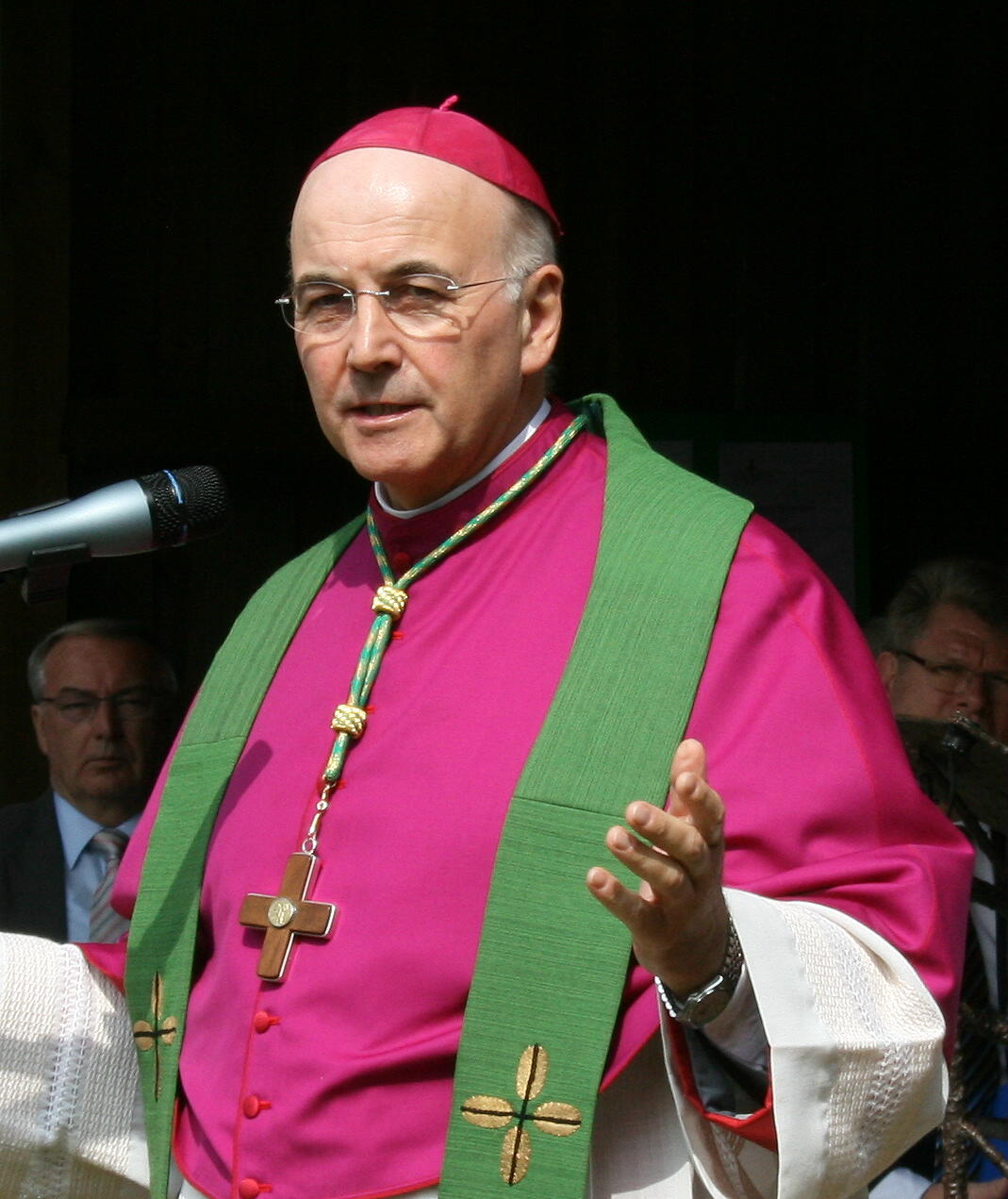
- Church: Catholic Church
- Diocese: Münster
- Appointed: 19 December 2008
- Installed: 29 March 2009
- Term ended: 9 March 2025
- Predecessor: Reinhard Lettmann
- Successor: Heiner Wilmer
- Previous posts: Bishop of Essen (2003–2008); Auxiliary Bishop of Trier (1999–2003); Titular Bishop of Uzalis (1999–2003)

Personal details
- Born: 6 March 1950 (age 76) Burgbrohl, Rhineland-Palatinate, Germany
- Education: University of Trier
- Motto: Latin: Annuntiamus vobis vitam

Ordination history
History
Priestly ordination
- Ordained by: Bernhard Stein
Episcopal consecration
- Principal consecrator: Hermann Josef Spital
- Co-consecrators: Franz-Josef Hermann Bode, Alfred Kleinermeilert

Felix Genn (born 6 March 1950) is a German bishop of the Catholic Church who was the Bishop of Münster from 2008 to 2025. He was the Bishop of Essen from 2003 to 2008 and an Auxiliary Bishop of Trier from 1999 to 2003. Since 2013, he has been a member of the Congregation for Bishops.

== Early life and education ==
Genn was born on 6 March 1950 in the municipality of Burgbrohl, which is located in the Ahrweiler district of the German state of Rhineland-Palatinate. He was raised on a farm in Wassenach and graduated from the Kurfürst-Salentin Gymnasium in Andernach in 1969. Between 1969 and 1974, he undertook the study of theology at the University of Trier and the University of Regensburg. Finally, on 29 June 1985, he received his PhD in theology from the University of Trier. He wrote his doctoral thesis on St. Augustine.

== Career ==
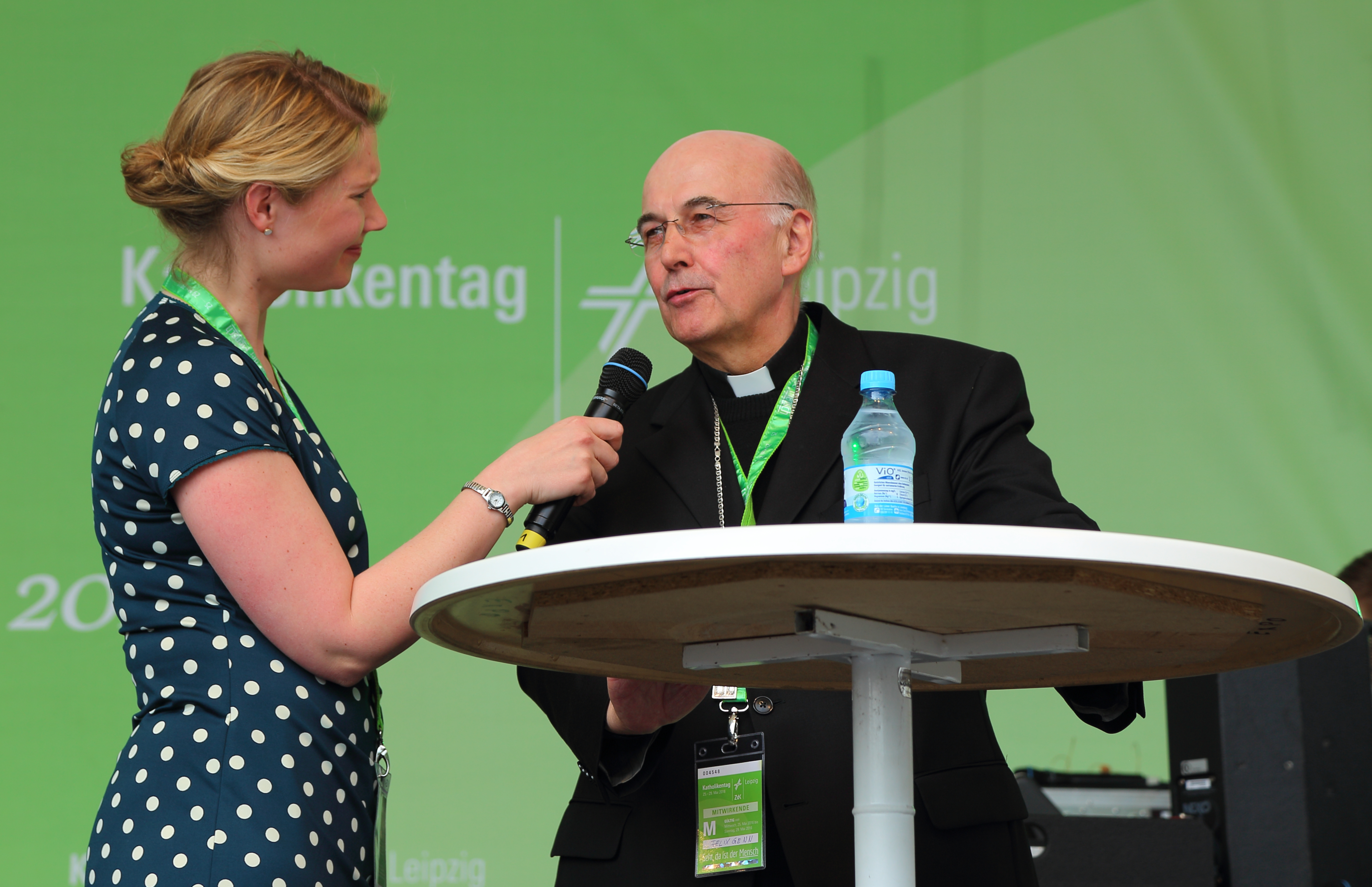
Genn speaking at the 100th Katholikentag in Leipzig

Genn was ordained a priest on 11 July 1976 in Trier by Bishop Bernhard Stein. Upon being made a priest, he was appointed a curate of the Holy Cross Church in Bad Kreuznach, a position he held for two years. In 1978, he was made the subregens (assistant head) of the diocesan seminary of Trier, where he remained until 1994. In 1985, he was made the seminary's spiritual director.

From 1994 to 1997, Genn was a permanent lecturer of the theological faculty of the University of Trier. Following this, he was made the regens of the St. Lambert House of Study in the castle at Lantershofen.

On 16 April 1999, Genn was appointed an Auxiliary Bishop of Trier and Titular Bishop of Uzalis by Pope John Paul II. He was consecrated a bishop in the Cathedral of Trier on 30 May 1999 and was given responsibility as vicar for the Visitation District of Saarland. Bishop Hermann Josef Spital was his principal consecrator, while Bishops Franz-Josef Hermann Bode and Alfred Kleinermeilert were his co-consecrators. On 4 April 2003, he was transferred by Pope John Paul II to be the third Bishop of Essen. He was enthroned in the diocese on 6 July 2003.

Genn was appointed the seventy-sixth Bishop of Münster on 19 December 2008 by Pope Benedict XVI after being elected by the cathedral chapter, succeeding Reinhard Lettmann. He was enthroned in the diocese on 29 March 2009. On 21 August 2010, he was awarded honorary citizenship of Wassenach.

As part of an overhaul of the Congregation for Bishops on 16 December 2013, Pope Francis appointed Genn as a member of the congregation.

In September 2022, in the context of the German national synod, Genn called for the reform of Catholic education on sexuality "because it is problematic when sexuality is primarily seen as sinful and when sexuality cannot be discussed".

Pope Francis accepted his resignation on 9 March 2025.

== Coat of arms ==
Current coat of arms

Arms as Bishop of Essen

Upon being made a bishop, Genn took up an episcopal coat of arms. Upon being made Bishop of Münster, he adopted a new coat of arms. On his current coat of arms, the yellow and red striped fields on the top left and bottom right of the shield are taken from the Diocese of Münster's coat of arms. The eagle in the top right field is indicative of Genn's hometown of Wassenach, as an eagle is present in its coat of arms, and is a remnant of his previous coats of arms as Bishop of Essen and Auxiliary Bishop of Trier. Moreover, the eagle relates to his Latin episcopal motto, Annuntiamus vobis vitam, which is taken from 1 John 1, 1–4.

The seven heads of grain in the lower left field reference Genn's peasant background. However, their number also symbolizes the fullness of life and believers of God who gather from all directions with a hunger and thirst for life.

Catholic Church titles
Preceded by Reinhard Lettmann	Bishop of Münster; 2008–2025	Vacant
Preceded by Hubert Luthe	Bishop of Essen; 2003–2008	Succeeded by Franz-Josef Overbeck
Preceded by Bernard Joseph Harrington	— TITULAR — Bishop of Uzalis; 1999–2003	Succeeded by Oscar Sarlinga
Preceded by —	Auxiliary Bishop of Trier; 1999–2003	Succeeded by —
