= Hubert Luthe =

German Roman Catholic bishop

- Bishop of Essen
- Church: Catholic Church
- Diocese: Diocese of Essen
- In office: 18 December 1991 – 22 May 2002
- Predecessor: Franz Hengsbach
- Successor: Felix Genn
- Previous posts: Titular Bishop of Egabro (1969-1991); Auxiliary Bishop of Cologne (1969-1991)

Orders
- Ordination: 2 July 1953 by Josef Frings
- Consecration: 14 December 1969 by Joseph Höffner

Personal details
- Born: 22 May 1927 Lindlar, Rhine Province, Free State of Prussia, Weimar Republic
- Died: 4 February 2014 (aged 86)
- Coat of arms

Hubert Luthe (22 May 1927 – 4 February 2014) was a German Roman Catholic bishop.

Ordained to the priesthood in 1951, Luthe was appointed titular bishop of Egabro and auxiliary bishop of the Roman Catholic Archdiocese of Cologne, Germany. In 1991, he appointed bishop of the Roman Catholic Diocese of Essen and retired in 2002.
