= Franz Hengsbach =

German Cardinal

His Eminence Franz Hengsbach
- Bishop of Essen
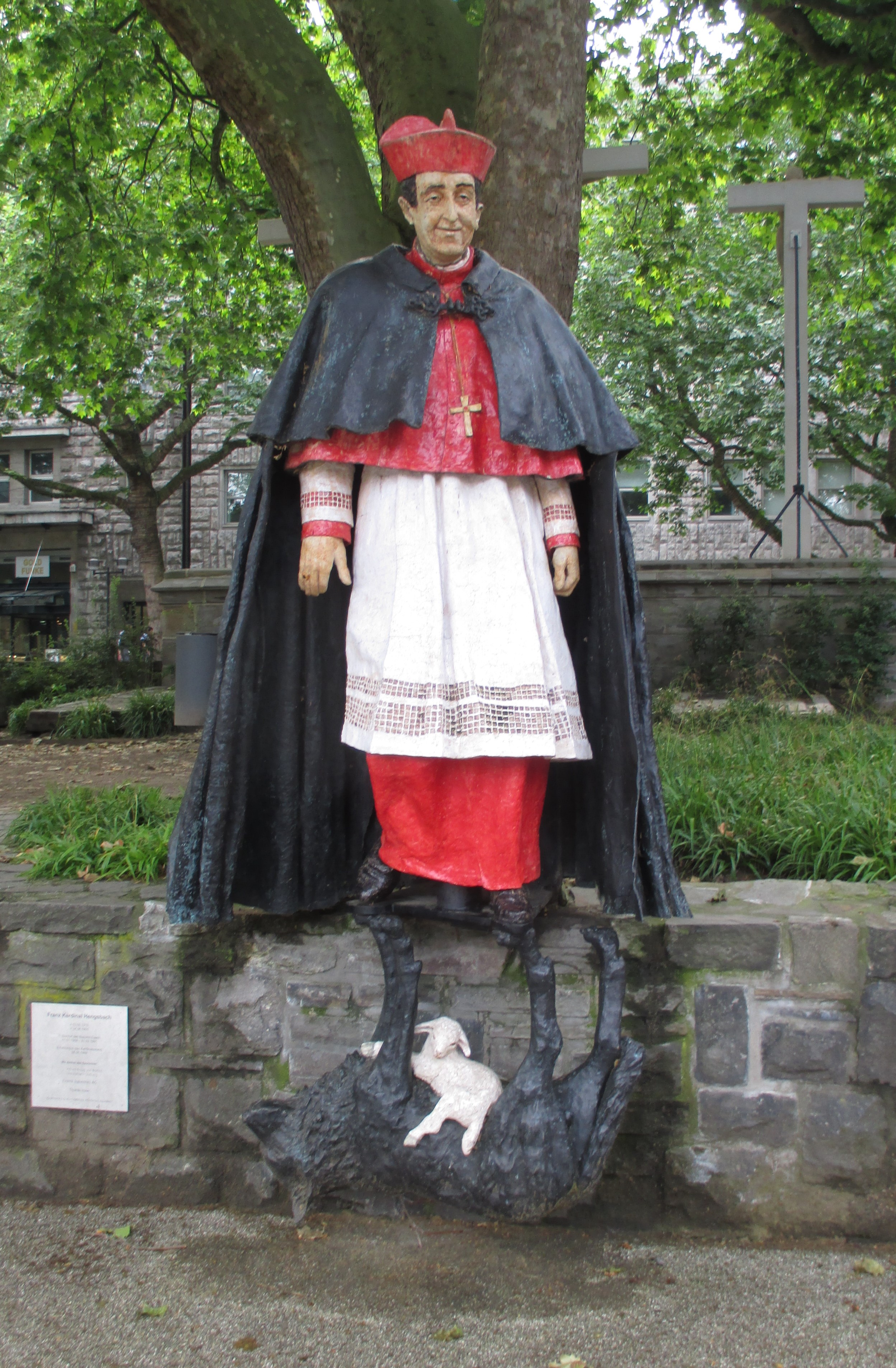
- Hengsbach memorial next to the Essen Cathedral, erected in 2011, removed in 2023.
- Church: Roman Catholic Church
- Diocese: Essen
- See: Essen
- Appointed: 18 November 1957
- Installed: 1 January 1958
- Term ended: 21 February 1991
- Other post: Cardinal-Priest of Nostra Signora di Guadalupe a Monte Mario (1988-91)
- Previous posts: Titular Bishop of Cantanus (1953-57); Auxiliary Bishop of Paderborn (1953-57); Military Vicar of Germany (1961-78); President of the Commission of the Bishops' Conferences of the European Community (1980-84); Vice-President of the Commission of the Bishops' Conferences of the European Community (1984-86)

Orders
- Ordination: 13 March 1937 by Kaspar Klein
- Consecration: 29 September 1953 by Lorenz Jaeger
- Created cardinal: 28 June 1988 by Pope John Paul II
- Rank: Cardinal-Priest

Personal details
- Born: Franz Hengsbach; 10 September 1910 Velmede, German Empire
- Died: 24 June 1991 (aged 80) Essen, Germany
- Buried: Essen Cathedral
- Education: Ludwig-Maximilians-Universität München
- Motto: Eritis mihi testes
- Coat of arms

Styles of Franz Hengsbach
- Reference style: His Eminence
- Spoken style: Your Eminence
- Informal style: Cardinal
- See: Essen (emeritus)

Franz Hengsbach (10 September 1910 – 24 June 1991) was a German Cardinal of the Roman Catholic Church who served as Bishop of Essen from 1957 to 1991, and was elevated to the cardinalate in 1988.

== Biography ==
Franz Hengsbach was born in Velmede to Johann and Theresia Hengsbach; he had five brothers and two sisters. He studied at the Institute of Brilon and the seminaries in Paderborn and Freiburg. Hengsbach obtained his doctorate in theology in 1944 from the Ludwig-Maximilians-Universität München, with a dissertation entitled Das Wesen der Verkündigung - Eine homiletische Untersuchung auf paulinischer Grundlag.

He was ordained to the priesthood by Archbishop Kaspar Klein on 13 March 1937, and then served as vicar of Herne-Bukau, St. Marien until 1946. Hengsbach became general secretary of the Akademische Bonifatius-Vereinigung in Paderborn in 1946, and of the Central Committee for the Preparation of German Catholics in 1947. From 1948 to 1958, he was director of the archdiocesan pastoral office of Paderborn. He was made Domestic Prelate of His Holiness in 1952, and secretary general of the Central Committee of German Catholics on 30 April 1952.

On 20 August 1953, Hengsbach was appointed Auxiliary Bishop of Paderborn and Titular Bishop of Cantanus by Pope Pius XI. He received his episcopal consecration on the following 29 September from Archbishop Lorenz Jäger, with Bishops Wilhelm Weskamm and Friedrich Rintelen serving as co-consecrators, in Paderborn Cathedral. Hengsbach was later named the first Bishop of Essen on 18 November 1957. The Bishop later founded Adveniat, an organization of the German episcopate to assist the Roman Catholic Church in Latin America, and was appointed bishop of the German Military Ordinariate on 10 October 1961. From 1962 to 1965, he attended the Second Vatican Council. Hengsbach also served as Grand Prior of the Equestrian Order of the Holy Sepulchre of Jerusalem, and was made President of the German Episcopal Commission for Universal Church Affairs in 1976. He was appointed a member of the Council of the European Episcopal Conference in 1977, and resigned from his post in the military ordinariate on 22 May 1978.

Pope John Paul II created him Cardinal-Priest of Nostra Signora di Guadalupe a Monte Mario in the consistory of 28 June 1988. Hengsbach lost the right to participate in any future papal conclave upon reaching the age of eighty on 10 September 1990 and, after a period of thirty-three years, resigned as Bishop of Essen on 21 February 1991.

The Cardinal died from complications after a stomach operation at an Essen hospital, aged 80. He is buried in the crypt of Essen Cathedral.

In September 2023, after three allegations for sexual misconduct erupted against the late Cardinal, his monumental statue in front of his cathedral in Essen was removed.

Catholic Church titles
Preceded by none	Bishop of Essen; 1957–1991	Succeeded by Hubert Luthe
Preceded by Joseph Wendel	Military vicar of Germany (West); 1961–1978	Succeeded by Elmar Kredel
