= Diocese of Essen =

Catholic diocese in Germany

Coordinates: 51.4559°N 7.0135°E

Diocese of Essen Dioecesis Essendiensis Bistum Essen

Catholic
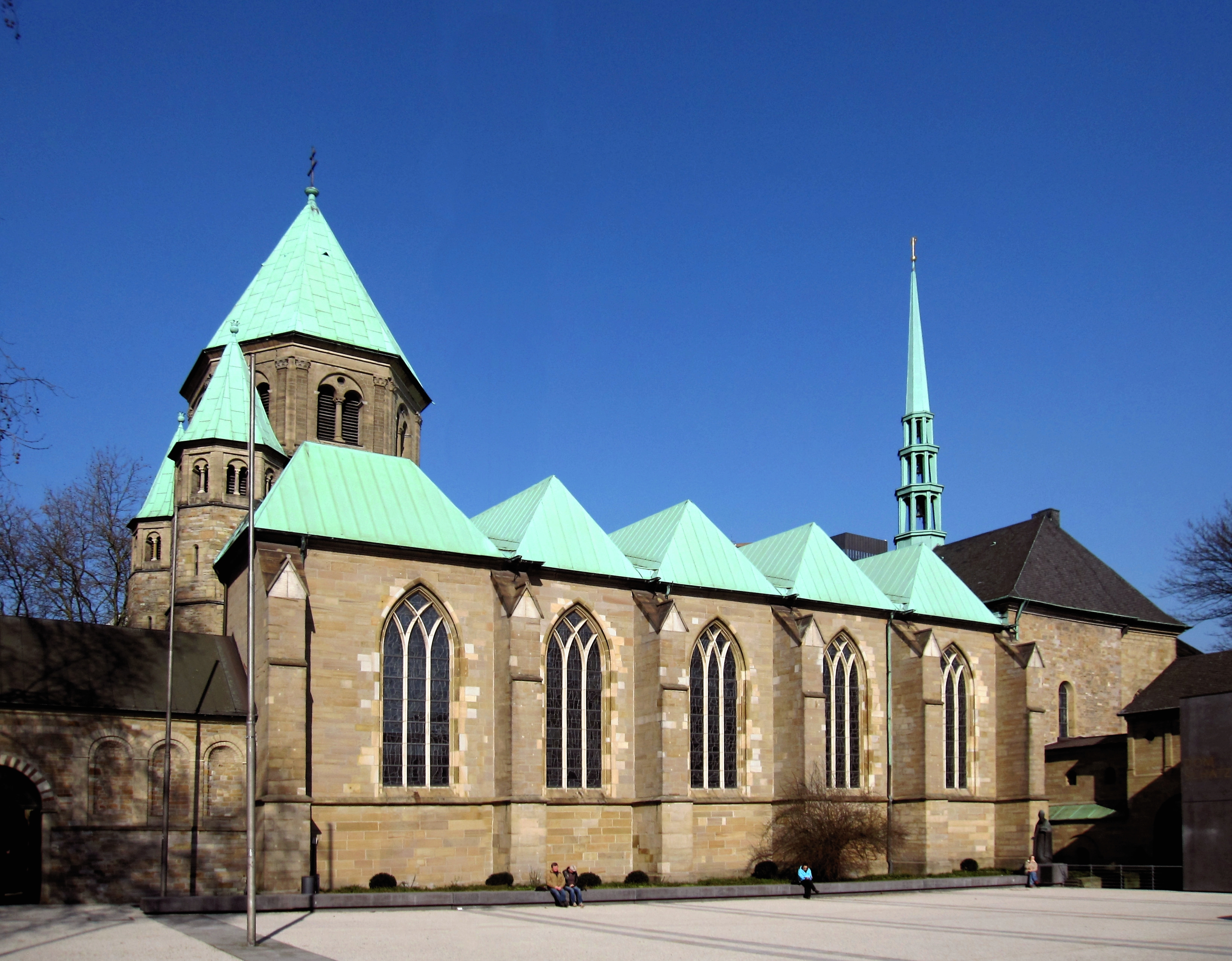
- Essen Cathedral

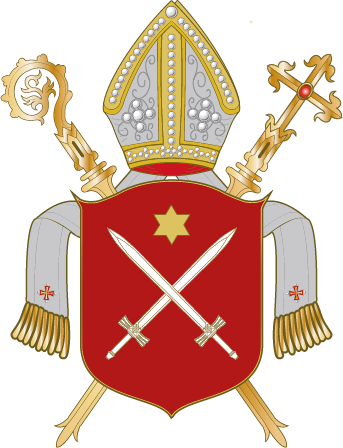
- Coat of arms

Location
- Country: Germany
- Ecclesiastical province: Cologne
- Metropolitan: Essen, North Rhine-Westphalia

Statistics
- Area: 1,877 km^{2} (725 sq mi)
- Population: Total; Catholics: (as of 2013); 2,525,313; 844,188 (33.4%)

Information
- Denomination: Catholic
- Rite: Roman Rite
- Established: 1 January 1958
- Cathedral: Essen Cathedral
- Patron saint: Our Lady of Good Counsel

Current leadership
- Pope: Leo XIV
- Bishop: Franz-Josef Overbeck; Bishop of Essen
- Metropolitan Archbishop: Rainer Maria Woelki
- Auxiliary Bishops: Ludger Schepers, Wilhelm Zimmermann

Map
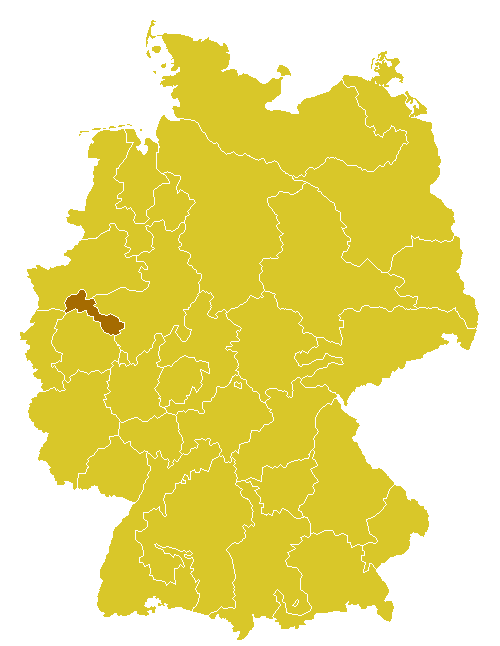

Website
- bistum-essen.de

The Diocese of Essen (Latin: Dioecesis Essendiensis) is a Latin Church diocese of the Catholic Church in Germany, founded on 1 January 1958. The Bishop of Essen is seated in Essen Cathedral (Essener Dom or Essener Münster), once the church of Essen Abbey, and over one thousand years old.

The diocese contains about one million Catholics in the heavily urbanized and industrial Ruhr Area.

== Bishops ==
- Franz Hengsbach (1957–1991)
- Hubert Luthe (1991–2002)
- Felix Genn (2003–2008)
- Franz-Josef Overbeck (since 20 December 2009); he was appointed Bishop of the Military Ordinariate of Germany, while remaining Bishop of Essen, by Pope Benedict XVI on 24 February 2011.

== Auxiliary bishops ==
- Ludger Schepers
- Wilhelm Zimmerman

== See also ==
- Essen
