= Hans-Jochen Jaschke =

German Catholic bishop (1941–2023)

The Most Reverend Hans-Jochen Jaschke
- Auxiliary Bishop Emeritus of Hamburg
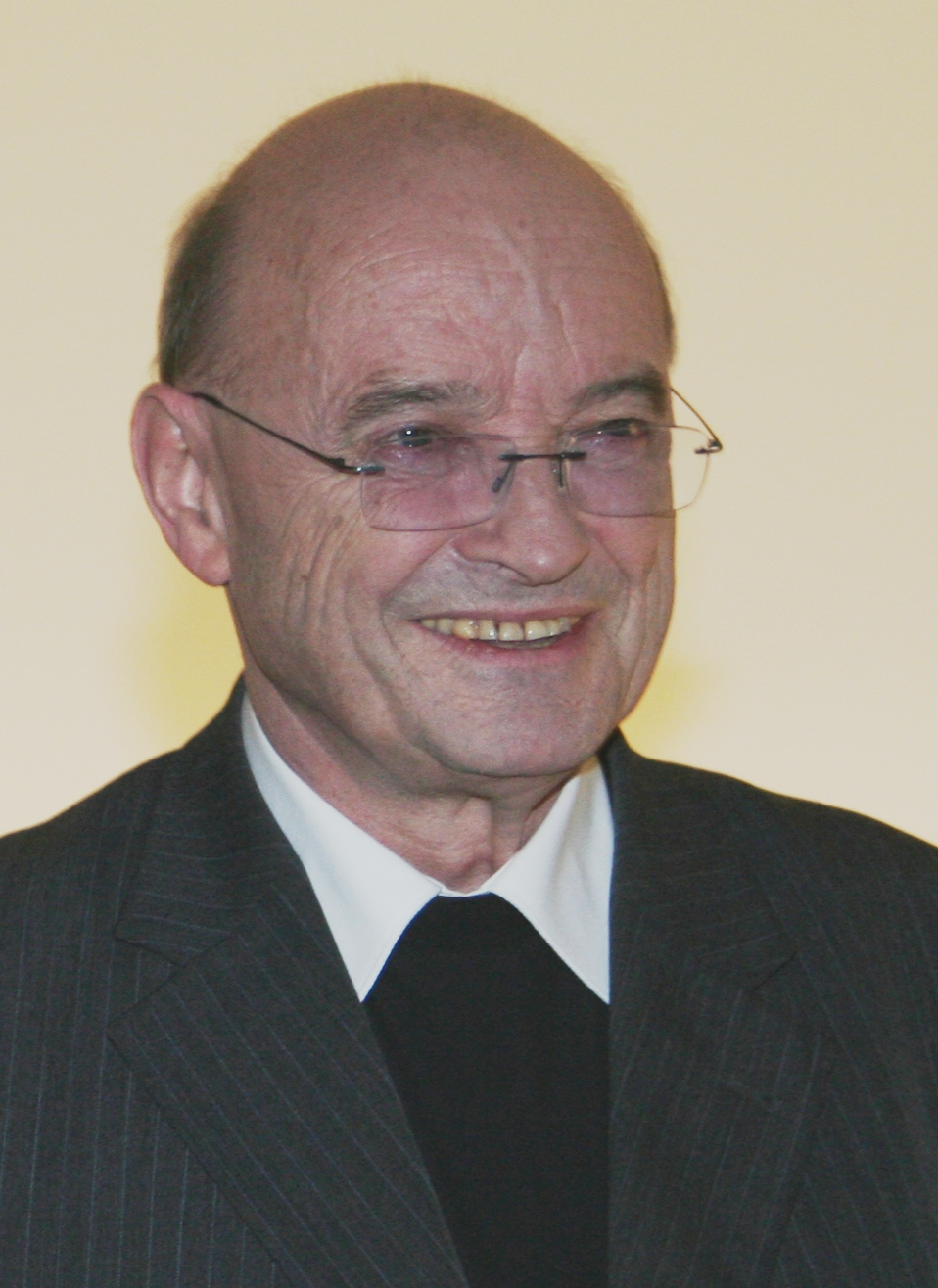
- Jaschke in 2012
- Church: Catholic
- Appointed: 24 October 1994
- Term ended: 8 October 2016
- Other post: Titular Bishop of Tisili (1988–2023)
- Previous post: Auxiliary Bishop of Osnabrück (1988–1994)

Orders
- Ordination: 28 January 1967
- Consecration: 8 January 1989 by Ludwig Averkamp

Personal details
- Born: 29 September 1941 Beuthen, Gau Upper Silesia, German Reich
- Died: 11 July 2023 (aged 81) Hamburg, Germany
- Education: Sankt Georgen Graduate School of Philosophy and Theology; University of Münster
- Motto: DONEC DIES ILLUCESCAT
- Coat of arms

Styles of Hans-Jochen Jaschke
- Reference style: His Excellency; The Most Reverend
- Spoken style: Your Excellency
- Religious style: Bishop

Hans-Jochen Jaschke (29 September 1941 – 11 July 2023) was a German Catholic prelate. He was auxiliary bishop of Osnabrück from 1989 to 1994 and of Hamburg from 1994 to 2016. He was responsible for ecumenism and inter-religious dialogue, and represented the Catholic Church in the media.

== Life and career ==
Jaschke was born in Beuthen, Gau Upper Silesia, on 29 September 1941, the son of a physician. After the family was expelled from Silesia when he was age 4 he grew up in Bückeburg. He completed school with the Abitur at the Adolphinum in 1961. He studied Catholic theology at the Sankt Georgen Graduate School of Philosophy and Theology in Frankfurt and at the University of Münster. He was consecrated as a deacon on 2 July 1966, and as priest on 28 January 1967 at St. Peter's Cathedral, Osnabrück, celebrating his first mass at St. Marien Immaculata Conceptio, Bückeburg.

He was vicar at St. Johann in Bremen from 1967 to 1970. He then studied further in Munich and Regensburg. His doctoral dissertation, "Der Heilige Geist im Bekenntnis der Kirche – Eine Studie zur Pneumatologie bei Irenäus von Lyon", about the pneumatology of Irenaeus was supervised by Joseph Ratzinger, the later Pope Benedict XVI. Jaschke directed the Niels-Stensen-Kolleg, the Theologenkonvikt of the Diocese of Osnabrück in Münster from 1974 to 1983. Afterwards he was a parish priest in Quakenbrück until 1988.

Jaschke was ordained as bishop by Pope John Paul II as titular bishop of Tisili to serve as auxiliary bishop of Osnabrück. He was consecrated at the Osnabrück Cathedral on 8 January 1989 by Ludwig Averkamp, bishop of Osnabrück.

In 1994 Jaschke was appointed auxiliary bishop in the Diocese of Hamburg. When the diocese became an archdiocese the following year, he was also Bischofsvikar for the doctrine of faith, responsible for ecumenism in the fields of church, culture and media. Within the German Bishops' Conference, he was a member of the commissions for ecumenism, world church and president of the sub-commission for dialogue among religions. He was also responsible for the pastoral care of the Federal Police (Bundesgrenzschutz) until 2016 when he passed this responsibility to Wolfgang Bischof.

Jaschke belonged to the Freitagsgesellschaft, a think tank of politicians, entrepreneurs, scientists, artists and theologians founded in 1985 by Helmut Schmidt. He was known nationwide by his presence in the media in many talk shows, not avoiding difficult questions such as celibacy, homosexual priests and pomposity of dignitaries.

He resigned in 2016 at age 75 – the normal age of retirement for bishops – which Pope Francis accepted on 8 October 2016.

Jaschke died in Hamburg on 11 July 2023, at age 81. He was buried at the Hamburg Cathedral on 15 July 2023 following a pontifical requiem mass held by Archbishop Stefan Heße, who said that Jaschke had given God's word his unmistakable voice in sound and thoughts, translating it into today's language. The mass was attended by representatives of politics such as Aydan Özoğuz, Melanie Leonhard and Andreas Dressel, of the Protestant Church in Germany including Bishops Kirsten Fehrs and Gothart Magaard and the former Bishop Maria Jepsen, and of several faiths including the Coptic Orthodox Church and Islam.

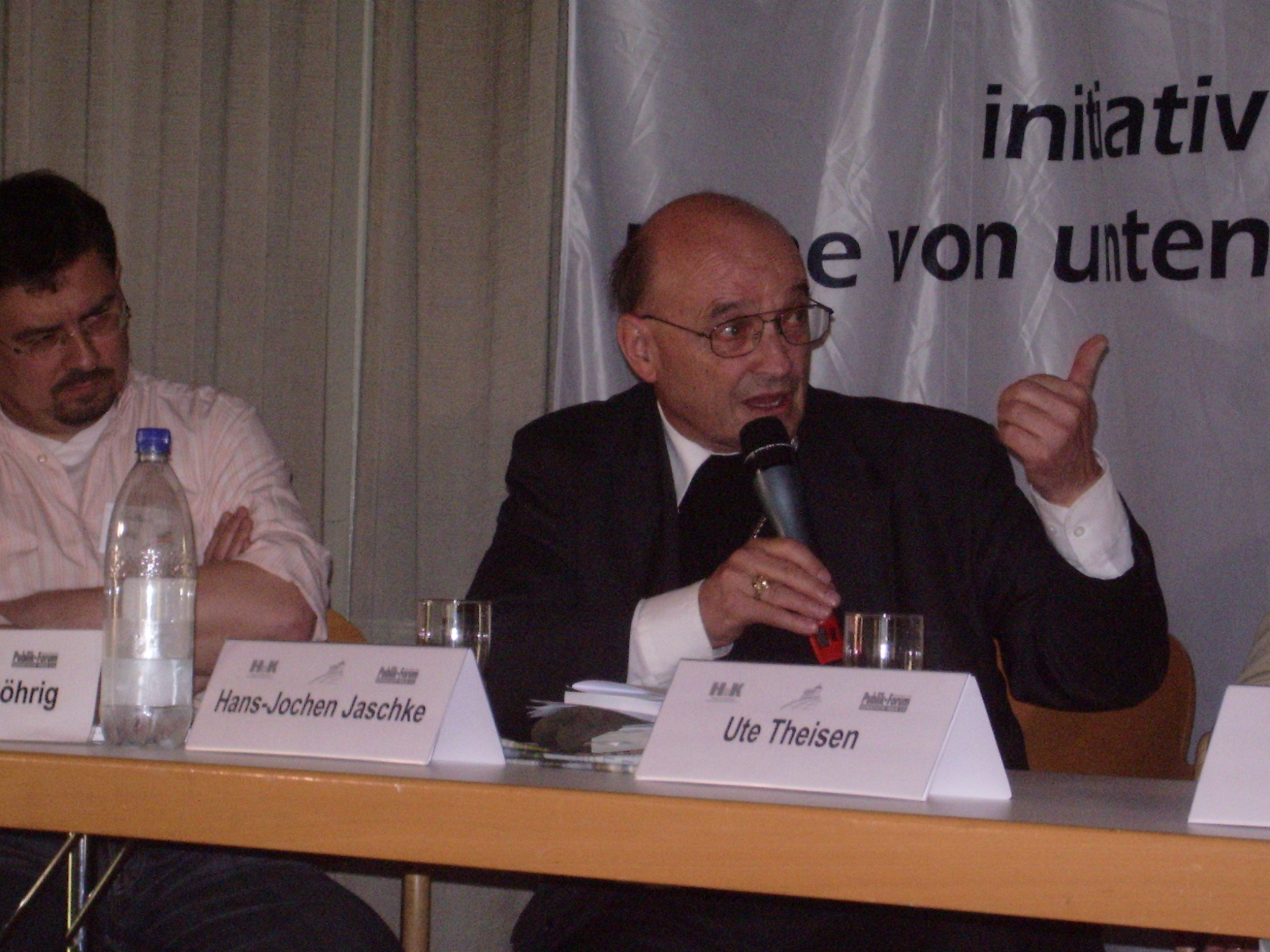
Jaschke in a podium discussion, 2008

== Publications ==
- Hans-Jochen Jaschke, et al.: Sankt Sophien – Hamburg-Barmbek – 90 Jahre in Gottes Hand, 1990
- Hans-Jochen Jaschke: Christus – gestern – heute – in Ewigkeit, DBK 1997
- Hans-Jochen Jaschke: Auf dem Weg zum Heiligen Jahr 2000, Sekretariat der Deutschen Bischofskonferenz 1. January 1999
  - Jesus Christus. Das menschliche Antlitz Gottes. Liturgische Arbeitshilfe für das erste Vorbereitungsjahr, vol. 1 (93 p.)
  - Gottes Geist in der Welt. Liturgische Arbeitshilfe für das zweite Vorbereitungsjahr 1998, vol. 5 (182 p)
  - Gottes Geist in der Welt. Pastorale Arbeitshilfe, vol. 6 (112 p.)
  - Christen vor der Zukunft. Unsere Verantwortung für die Gesellschaft, vol. 7 (125 p.)
  - Gottes Geist in der Welt. Ökumenische Arbeitshilfe, vol. 8 (202 p.)
- Hans-Jochen Jaschke: Dialogbuch: Festschrift für Hans-Jochen Jaschke, S. Dreyer (Erzbistum Hamburg) 2001, ISBN 978-3-00008-199-6
- Fernando Enns, Hans-Jochen Jaschke (eds.): Gemeinsam berufen, Friedensstifter zu sein. Zum Dialog zwischen Katholiken und Mennoniten. Neufeld Verlag Schwarzenfeld 2008, ISBN 978-3-937896-70-0
- Hans-Jochen Jaschke, et al.: Zur Legitimierbarkeit von Macht, Verlag Karl Alber 2008, ISBN 978-3-49548-330-5
