= Karl Joseph Schulte =

Catholic cardinal

His Eminence Karl Joseph Schulte
- Cardinal, Archbishop of Cologne
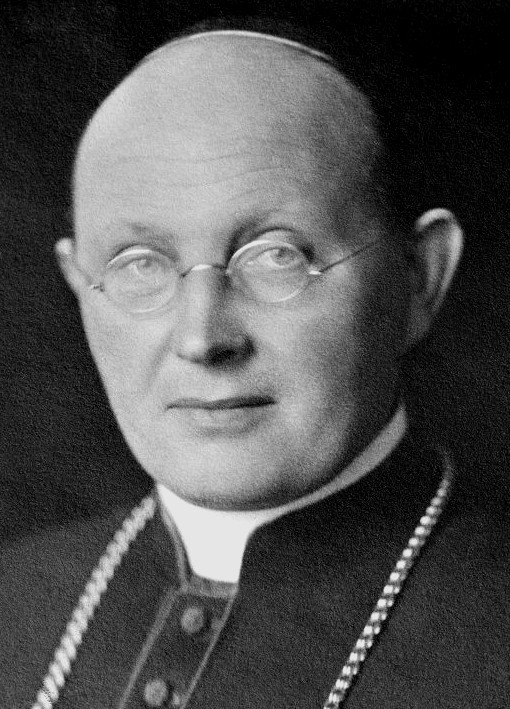
- Church: Roman Catholic
- Archdiocese: Cologne
- Installed: 25 March 1920
- Term ended: 11 March 1941
- Predecessor: Felix von Hartmann
- Successor: Josef Frings
- Other post: Cardinal-Priest of Santi Quattro Coronati
- Previous post: Bishop of Paderborn (1909-1920)

Orders
- Ordination: 22 March 1895 by Hubert Simar
- Consecration: 19 March 1910 by Anton Fischer
- Created cardinal: 7 March 1921 by Benedict XV
- Rank: Cardinal-Priest

Personal details
- Born: 14 September 1871 Velbert, Germany
- Died: 11 March 1941 (aged 69) Cologne, Germany
- Buried: Cologne Cathedral
- Parents: Oswald Schulte; Antonetta Schlünder
- Coat of arms

Styles of Karl Schulte
- Reference style: His Eminence
- Spoken style: Your Eminence
- Informal style: Cardinal
- See: Cologne

Karl Joseph Schulte (14 September 1871 – 11 March 1941), was a German Cardinal of the Roman Catholic Church who served as Archbishop of Cologne from 1920 to his death and was elevated to the cardinalate in 1921.

== Biography ==
Karl Joseph Schulte was born in Haus Valbert (part of Lennestadt), to Oswald and Antonetta (née Schlünder) Schulte. Confirmed on 24 July 1887, he studied at the seminary in Essen and the University of Tübingen (from where he obtained a doctorate in theology on 5 March 1903). Schulte was ordained to the priesthood by Bishop Hubert Simar on 22 March 1895.

He then did pastoral work in Paderborn, including serving as a vicar in Witten, until 1901. He was a repetitor at the Collegio Leonino and Major Seminary of Paderborn from 1901 to 1905, whence he began teaching theology, canon law, and apologetics at the Theological Faculty of Paderborn. In 1908 he became an official episcopal counselor. He was the first editor of the journal Theologie und Glaube, published by the department of theology in Paderborn.

On 30 November 1909 Schulte was elected Bishop of Paderborn, a choice confirmed by Pope Pius X on 7 February 1910. He received his episcopal consecration on the following 19 March from Cardinal Anton Fischer, with Bishops Michael Korum and Hermann Dingelstadt serving as co-consecrators, in the Paderborn Cathedral. Schulte, who during World War I organized a large relief force for the British and French prisoners in German prison camps, was later named Archbishop of Cologne on 8 March 1920.

Pope Benedict XV created him cardinal-priest of Santi Quattro Coronati in the consistory of 7 March 1921. Schulte was one of the cardinal electors in the 1922 papal conclave, and again in the conclave of 1939. He was also a strong opponent of both communism and Nazism, though he publicly cheered the Germans' remilitarization of the Rhineland and praised Hitler at Cologne Cathedral for "sending back our army".

The Cardinal died in Cologne, at age 69. He is buried in the archiepiscopal crypt of the Cologne Cathedral.

Catholic Church titles
Preceded by Wilhelm Schneider	Bishop of Paderborn; 1909–1920	Succeeded by Kaspar Klein
Preceded by Felix von Hartmann	Archbishop of Cologne; 1920–1941	Succeeded by Josef Frings
