= Diocese of Osnabrück =

Catholic diocese in Germany

Coordinates: 52.2776°N 8.0447°E

Diocese of Osnabrück Dioecesis Osnabrugensis Bistum Osnabrück

Catholic
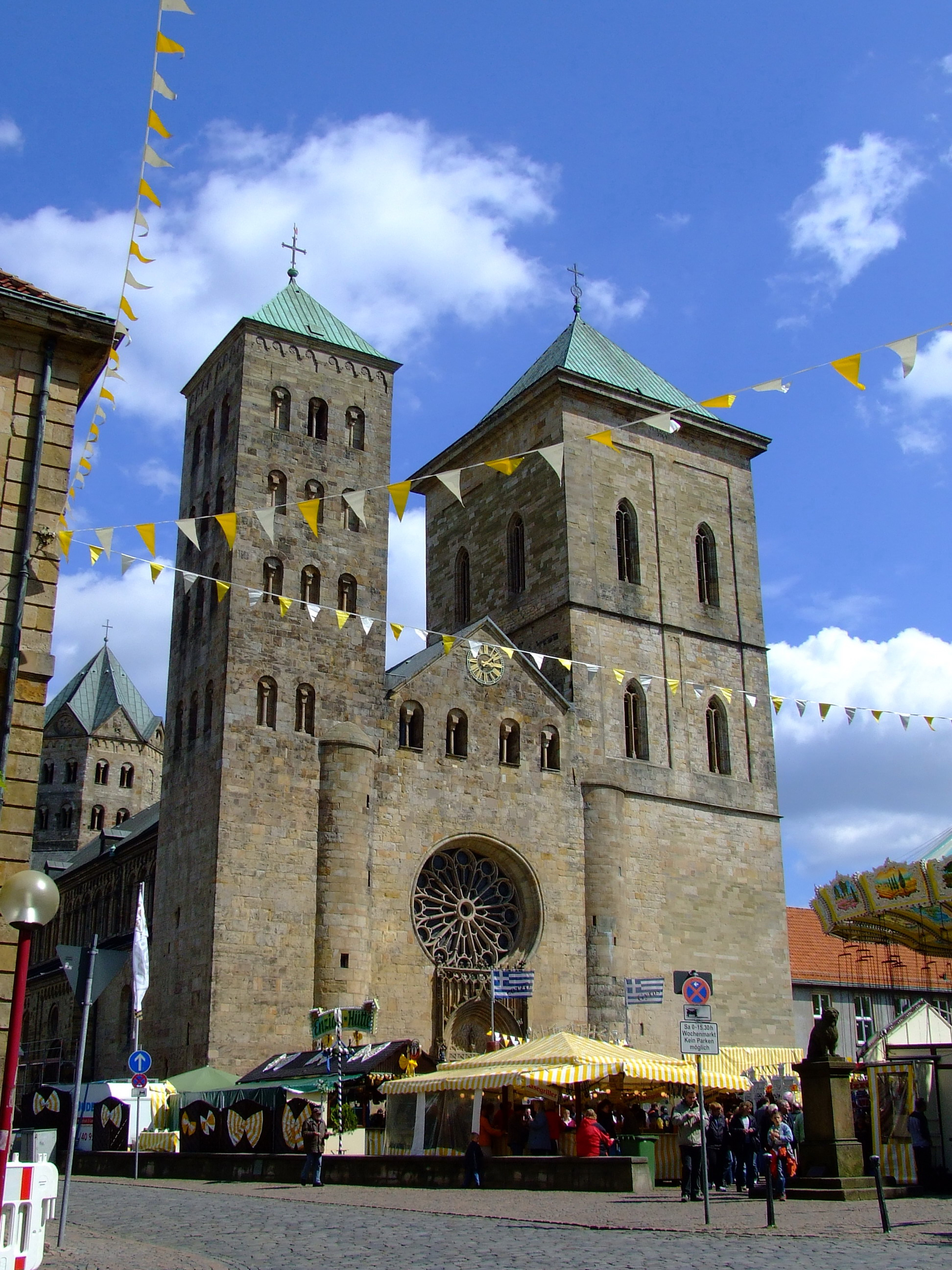
- St Peter's Cathedral, Osnabrück

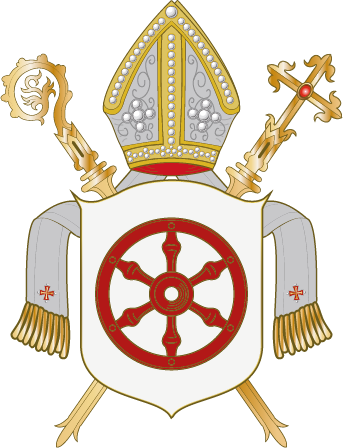
- Coat of arms

Location
- Country: Germany
- Ecclesiastical province: Hamburg

Statistics
- Area: 12,573 km^{2} (4,854 sq mi)
- Population: Total; Catholics: (as of 2013); 2,150,000; 569,400 (26.5%)
- Parishes: 256

Information
- Denomination: Catholic Church
- Sui iuris church: Latin Church
- Rite: Roman Rite
- Established: 772
- Cathedral: St. Peter's Cathedral
- Secular priests: 320

Current leadership
- Pope: Leo XIV
- Bishop-designate: Dominicus Meier
- Metropolitan Archbishop: Stefan Heße
- Auxiliary Bishops: Johannes Wübbe
- Bishops emeritus: Franz-Josef Bode; Theodor Kettmann

Map
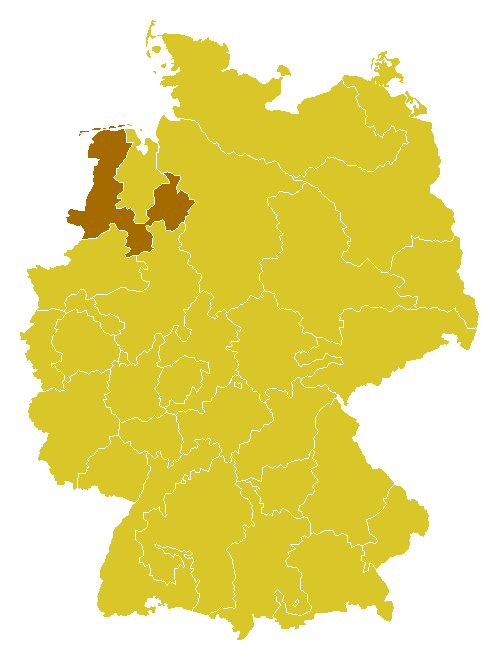
- Map of Diocese of Osnabrück

Website
- bistum-osnabrueck.de

The Diocese of Osnabrück (Latin: Dioecesis Osnabrugensis) is a Latin Church ecclesiastical territory or diocese of the Catholic church in Germany. The diocese was originally founded circa 800. It should not be confused with the smaller Prince-Bishopric of Osnabrück–an ecclesiastical principality of the Holy Roman Empire until 1803–over which the bishop, as prince-bishop, exercised both temporal and spiritual authority.

== History ==
=== The Prince-Bishopric of Osnabrück ===
The diocese was erected in 772 and it is certainly the oldest see founded by Charlemagne, in order to Christianize the conquered stem-duchy of Saxony. The first bishop of Osnabrück was Saint Wilho (785–804); the second bishop, Meginhard or Meingoz (804–33), was the real organizer of the see. Osnabrück diocese was originally a suffragan to the Archdiocese of Cologne (until 1824).

The temporal possessions of the see, originally quite limited, grew in time, and its prince-bishops exercised an extensive civil jurisdiction within the territory covered by their rights of immunity. The prince-bishopric continued to grow in size, making its status during the Reformation a highly contentious issue.

During the Protestant Reformation of the 16th century, Osnabrück did not remain completely Catholic nor switch to Protestantism. Instead, each parish decided on its own which elements of Protestantism it took over. This unique state of affairs ended with the Peace of Westphalia (1648), which froze the parishes at their religious status as of 1624. From then on, the bishops alternated between Lutheran and Catholic office holders. While the prince-bishopric was ruled by a Protestant bishop, the Archbishop of Cologne would oversee the exercise of the Catholic religion in Osnabrück.

The Protestant bishops were selected from the neighboring Duchy of Brunswick-Lüneburg, with priority given to the cadets of what became the House of Hanover. The last Prince-Bishop of Osnabrück, the Lutheran Prince Frederick of Great Britain (1764–1803), was made Bishop in 1764 when he was only 197 days old. At the time, he was the younger of two sons of George III, giving him the strongest claim to election as prince-bishop.

In the German Mediatisation of 1803, the bishopric was dissolved and given to the Hanover branch of Brunswick-Lüneburg; the see, the chapter, the convents and the Catholic charitable institutions were finally secularized. The territory of the see passed to Prussia in 1806, to the Kingdom of Westphalia in 1807, to Napoleonic France in 1810, and again to Hanover in 1814. Klemens von Gruben, titular Bishop of Paros, was made vicar Apostolic, and as such cared for the spiritual interests of the Catholic population.

=== The restoration of the diocese ===
Under Pope Leo XII the papal bull Impensa Romanorum Pontificum (26 March 1824) re-established the See of Osnabrück as an exempt see, i.e., immediately subject to Rome. This Bull, recognized by the civil authority, promised that, for the present, the Bishop of Hildesheim would be also Bishop of Osnabrück, but had to be represented at Osnabrück by a vicar-general and an auxiliary bishop, and this lasted for thirty years.

This diocese, comprised within the Kingdom of Hanover, the Landdrosteien (high-bailiwicks, governorates) of Osnabrück and Aurich (excepting Wilhelmshaven) and those parts of Hanover that were west of the River Weser. In 1910 it numbered 12 deaneries, 108 parishes, 153 pastoral stations, 271 secular and 12 regular priests, with 204,500 Catholic faithful. The only religious communities of men were the Capuchin convent at Clemenswerth and the Apostolic School of the Marists at Meppen. The religious orders of women include Benedictines, Borromeans, Franciscans, Ursulines and others.

As Apostolic administrator, the bishop was Vicar Apostolic of the Northern Missions of Germany and Prefect-Apostolic of Schleswig-Holstein (as of 1868). According to the Bull Impensa Romanorum (26 March 1824), he was elected by the chapter of the cathedral, composed of a dean, six canons and four vicars, elected in turn by the bishop and by the chapter.

Klemens von Gruben was succeeded by the auxiliary bishop Karl Anton von Lüpke, also administrator of the North German Missions. After his death new negotiations led to the endowment of a new independent see. Pope Pius IX, with the consent of King George V of Hanover, appointed Paulus Melchers of Münster as bishop on 3 August 1857. In 1866 the territory of the diocese passed, with Hanover, to Prussia (Province of Hanover); Melchers became Archbishop of Cologne, and was succeeded in 1866 by Johannes Heinrich Beckmann (1866–78), who was succeeded by Bernhard Höting (1882–98) after a vacancy of four years owing to the Kulturkampf. The next bishop (to 1911), Hubert Voss, was appointed 12 April 1899.

In 1930, following the Prussian Concordat, the Prefecture of Schleswig-Holstein and the Northern Missions of Germany, comprising several Protestant areas of Northern Germany, were added to the diocese: Hamburg, Bremen, Schleswig-Holstein, Mecklenburg-Schwerin, Mecklenburg-Strelitz and Schaumburg-Lippe (the latter ceded to Hildesheim diocese in 1965). On the same occasion Osnabrück became again a suffragan of Cologne.

In 1995, the northern parts of the Diocese (Hamburg, Schleswig-Holstein and Mecklenburg) were made into the newly founded Archdiocese of Hamburg. Osnabrück became subordinate to this Archdiocese of Hamburg. The former Bishop of Osnabrück was Franz-Josef Bode. His resignation was accepted by the Pope on March 25, 2023.

== Incumbents of the see ==
=== Bishops ===
- 783–809: Wiho I (Wicho I; 783 to 1 April 809)
- 810–829: Maynard (Meginhard; 810 to 12 April 829)
- 829–845: Goswin
- 845–860: Gosbert (845 to 11 April 860)
- 860–887: Eckbert (860 to 1 February 887)
- 887–906: Egilmar (887 to 11 May 906)
- 906–918: Bernard I
- 918–949: Dodo I (918 to 14 May 949)
- 949–967: Drogo (949 to 7 November 967)
- 967–978: Ludolf (967 to 31 March 978)
- 978–996: Dodo II (978 to 12 April 996)
  - 978–980: Kuno (counter-bishop)
- 996–1000: Günther (996 to 27 November 1000)
- 998–1003: Wodilulf (998 to 17 February 1003)
- 1003–1022: Dietmar (1003 to 18 June 1022)
- 1023–1027: Meginher (1023 to 10 December 1027)
- 1028–1036: Gozmar (1028 to 10 December 1036)
- 1036–1052: Alberich (1036 to 19 April 1052)
- 1052–1067: Benno I (Werner; 1052–3 December 1067)
- 1068–1088: Benno II (also Bernard; 1068 to 27 July 1088)
- 1088–1093: Marquard
- 1093–1101: Wicho II (1093 to 21 April 1101)
- 1101–1109: John I (1101 to 13 July 1109)
- 1109–1119: Gottschalk of Diepholz (1109 to 1 January 1119)
- 1119–1137: Diethard
  - 1119–1125: Conrad (counter-bishop)
- 1137–1141: Udo of Steinfurt (1137 to 28 June 1141)
- 1141–1173: Philipp von Katzenelnbogen (1141 to 15 June 1173)
  - 1141: Wezel (counter-bishop)
- 1173–1190: Arnold of Altena
- 1190–1216: Gerard I of Oldenburg-Wildeshausen
- 1216–1224: Adolphus of Tecklenburg

=== Prince-bishops and administrators ===
Prince-Bishops of Osnabrück include:

- 1224–1226: Engelbert I of Isenberg
- 1206–1227: Otto I
- 1227–1239: Conrad I of Velber
- 1239–1250: Engelbert I of Isenberg
- 1251–1258: Bruno of Isenberg
- 1259–1264: Baldwin of Rüssel
- 1265–1269: Widukind of Waldeck
- 1270–1297: Conrad II of Rietberg
- 1297–1308: Louis of Ravensberg
- 1309–1320: Engelbert II of Weyhe
- 1321–1349: Gottfried of Arnsberg
- 1350–1366: John II Hoet
- 1366–1376: Melchior of Brunswick-Grubenhagen
- 1376–1402: Dietrich of Horne
- 1402–1410: Henry I of Schaumburg-Holstein
- 1410–1424: Otto II of Hoya
- 1424–1437: John III of Diepholz
- 1437–1442: Eric of Hoya
- 1442–1454: sede vacante
  - 1442–1450: Henry of Moers (Catholic administrator; Nov 1441 Appointed – 2 Jun 1450 Died)
  - 1450–1454: Albert of Hoya (Catholic administrator)
- 1454–1455: Rudolf of Diepholz (30 Aug 1454 Appointed – 24 Mar 1455 Died)
- 1455–1482: Conrad III of Diepholz (11 Jun 1455 Appointed – 21 May 1482 Died)
- 1482–1508: Conrad IV of Rietberg (13 Jul 1482 Appointed – 9 Feb 1508 Died)
- 1508–1532: Eric of Brunswick-Grubenhagen (6 Mar 1508 Appointed – 14 May 1532 Died)
- 1532–1553: Francis of Waldeck (11 Jun 1532 Appointed – 15 Jul 1553 Died; from 1543 on Lutheran)
- 1553–1574: John II of Hoya zu Stolzenau † (5 Oct 1553 Appointed – 5 Apr 1574 Died)
- 1574–1585: Henry II of Saxe-Lauenburg (Lutheran; 1574 Appointed – 3 May 1585 Died)
- 1585: William of Schenking zu Bevern (30 Jul 1585 Appointed – 8 Aug 1585 Died)
- 1585–1591: Bernard of Waldeck (25 Oct 1585 Appointed – 25 May 1588 Resigned)
- 1591–1623: Philip Sigismund of Brunswick-Wolfenbüttel (5 Jun 1591 Appointed – 19 Mar 1623 Died)
- 1623–1625: Eitel Frederick of Hohenzollern-Sigmaringen (Catholic; 28 Apr 1623 Appointed – 19 Sep 1625 Died)
- 1625–1634: Francis of Wartenberg (Catholic; 27 Oct 1625 Appointed – 1 Dec 1661 Died)
- 1634–1648: Gustav Gustavsson af Vasaborg (Lutheran)
- 1648–1661: Francis of Wartenberg (Catholic)
- 1662–1698: Ernest Augustus I of Brunswick and Lunenburg (Calenberg) (Lutheran; 1662 Appointed – 29 Jan 1698 Died)
- 1698–1715: Charles Joseph of Lorraine (Catholic; 14 Apr 1698 Appointed – 4 Dec 1715 Died)
- 1715–1728: Ernest Augustus II of York and Albany (Lutheran; 1716 Appointed – 14 Aug 1728 Died)
- 1728–1761: Clemence Augustus of Bavaria (Catholic; 4 Nov 1728 Appointed – 6 Feb 1761 Died)
- 1764–1802: Frederick of York and Albany (Lutheran; 1764 Appointed – 10 Nov 1802 Resigned), last prince-bishop before its mediatisation to Hanover.

=== Sede vacante ===
- 1802–1857: sede vacante
  - 1803–1827: Karl von Gruben, Catholic Vicar Apostolic to the See of Osnabrück, void of any regalia
  - 1830–1855: Carl Anton Lüpke, Catholic leading auxiliary bishop
  - 1855–1857: Eduard Jakob Wedekin, in personal union Catholic bishop of Hildesheim

=== Ordinaries ===
- 1857–1866: Paul Ludolf Melchers, S.J. † (3 Aug 1857 Appointed – 8 Jan 1866 Appointed, afterwards Archbishop of Cologne)
- 1866–1878: Johannes Heinrich Beckmann (5 Apr 1866 Appointed – 30 Jul 1878 Died)
- 1878–1882: sede vacante
- 1882–1898: Johann Bernard Höting † (10 Feb 1882 Appointed – 21 Oct 1898 Died)
- 1899–1914: Heinrich Hubert Aloysius Voß (Voss) † (12 Apr 1899 Appointed – 3 Mar 1914 Died)
- 1914–1955: Hermann Wilhelm Berning † (14 Jul 1914 Appointed – 23 Nov 1955 Died)
- 1956–1957: Gerhard Franz (Franziskus) Demann † (21 May 1956 Appointed – 27 Mar 1957 Died)
- 1957–1987: Helmut Hermann Wittler † (22 Jul 1957 Appointed – 9 Sep 1987 Resigned)
- 1987–1994: Ludwig Averkamp (9 Sep 1987 Succeeded – 24 Oct 1994 Appointed, afterwards Archbishop of Hamburg)
- 1995–2023: Franz-Josef Hermann Bode (12 Sep 1995 Appointed – 15 mar 2023 Resigned)
- 2024–: Dominicus Meier (28 May 2024 Appointed)

== Auxiliary bishops ==
- Johannes Fabri (bishop of Osnabrück), O.F.M. (20 Nov 1434 - Mar 1451)
- Godefridus Yerwerd, O.S.B. (13 Feb 1471 - 28 Mar 1476)
- Johannes Meppen, O.S.A. (24 Jan 1477 - 1495)
- Heinrich Schodehoet, O.S.A. (8 Jan 1494 - 1515)
- Johannes Pictor Meler, O.S.A. (15 Jan 1518 - 1529)
- Kaspar Münster, O. Carm. (13 Feb 1631 - 4 Feb 1654)
- Ägidius Gelenius (29 Apr 1655 - 24 Aug 1656)
- Johann Bischopinck (9 Jul 1657 - 19 Sep 1667)
- Otto Wilhelm von Bronckhorst zu Gronsfeld, S.J. (2 Jan 1693 - 5 Apr 1713)
- Hyacinth Petit, O. Carm. (11 Feb 1718 - 26 Jul 1719)
- Johann Friedrich Adolf von Hörde zu Schönholthausen (15 Mar 1723 - 3 Aug 1761)
- Johann Hugo von Gäertz (4 Feb 1715 - 31 Dec 1716)
- Wilhelm von Alhaus, O.S.C. (3 Sep 1764 - 26 May 1794)
- Karl Klemens von Gruben (1 Jun 1795 - 4 Jul 1827)
- Karl Anton Joseph Lüpke (5 Jul 1830 - 8 Apr 1855)
- Johannes Albert von Rudloff (1 Apr 1950 - 29 Jun 1978)
- Bernhard Schräder (22 Jun 1959 - 10 Dec 1971)
- Karl-August Siegel (12 Dec 1974 - 18 Nov 1988)
- Hubert Brandenburg (12 Dec 1974 - 21 Nov 1977)
- Hans-Jochen Jaschke (18 Nov 1988 - 24 Oct 1994)
- Theodor Kettmann (27 Nov 1978 - 30 Nov 2011)
- Johannes Wübbe 18 Jun 2013)
