= Stefan Heße =

German Catholic prelate

The Most Reverend Stefan Heße
- Archbishop of Hamburg
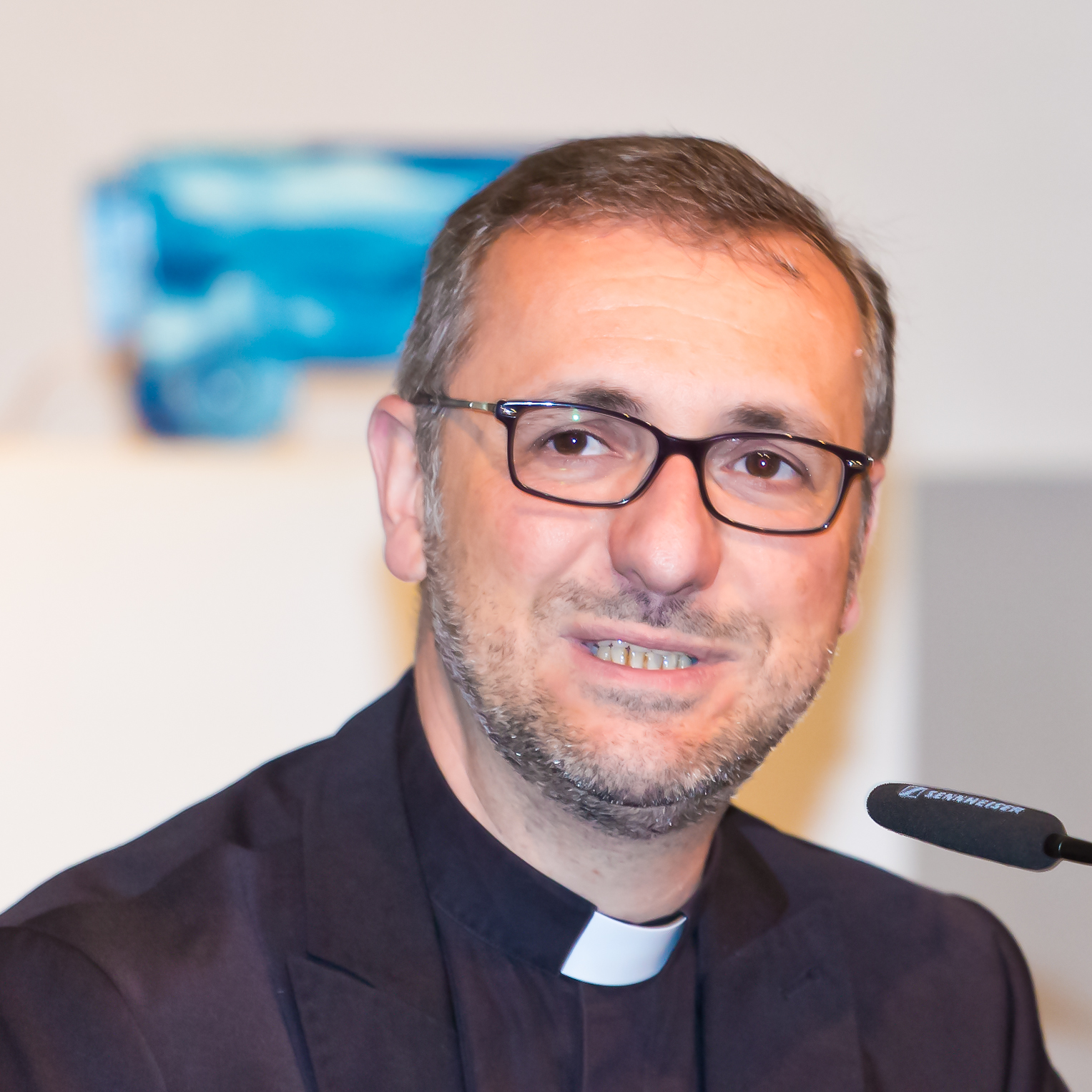
- Heße at a press conference in 2015
- Church: Roman Catholic Church
- See: Archdiocese of Hamburg
- Appointed: 26 January 2015
- Installed: 14 March 2015
- Predecessor: Werner Thissen

Orders
- Ordination: 18 June 1993 by Cardinal Joachim Meisner
- Consecration: 14 March 2015 by Franz-Josef Hermann Bode, Bishop of Osnabrück

Personal details
- Born: 7 August 1966 (age 60) Cologne, West Germany
- Education: University of Bonn; University of Regensburg
- Motto: Apud Deum omnia possibilia (Latin: With God all things are possible)
- Coat of arms: Stefan Heße's coat of arms

Stefan Heße (born 7 August 1966) is a German Catholic prelate who has served as Archbishop of Hamburg since 2015. The youngest diocesan bishop in Germany, he has often been outspoken on social and religious topics.

== Biography ==
=== Early life and priesthood ===
Heße was born in Cologne, West Germany, on 7 August 1966. Born to a family of bakers, he grew up in the city's Junkersdorf district. He attended George Büchner Gymnasium in Cologne's Weiden district. After graduation in 1986, he studied theology and philosophy at the University of Bonn and University of Regensburg.

Heße was ordained on 18 June 1993 by Cardinal Joachim Meisner in the Cologne Cathedral. From 1993 to 1997 he was pastor at St. Remigius Church in the city of Bergheim. From 1997 to 2003 he was a lecturer at the Collegium Albertinum, a seminary in Bonn, while pursuing his doctorate. In 2001 he received his Doctor of Theology from the Philosophical-Theological School in Vallendar with a dissertation on Hans Urs van Balthasar, the Swiss Catholic theologian. From 2003 to 2005 he headed the Department of Pastoral Services of the Archdiocese of Cologne. Also in 2003, he took up the additional position as the archdiocesan delegate for radio and television, a post he held until 2012.

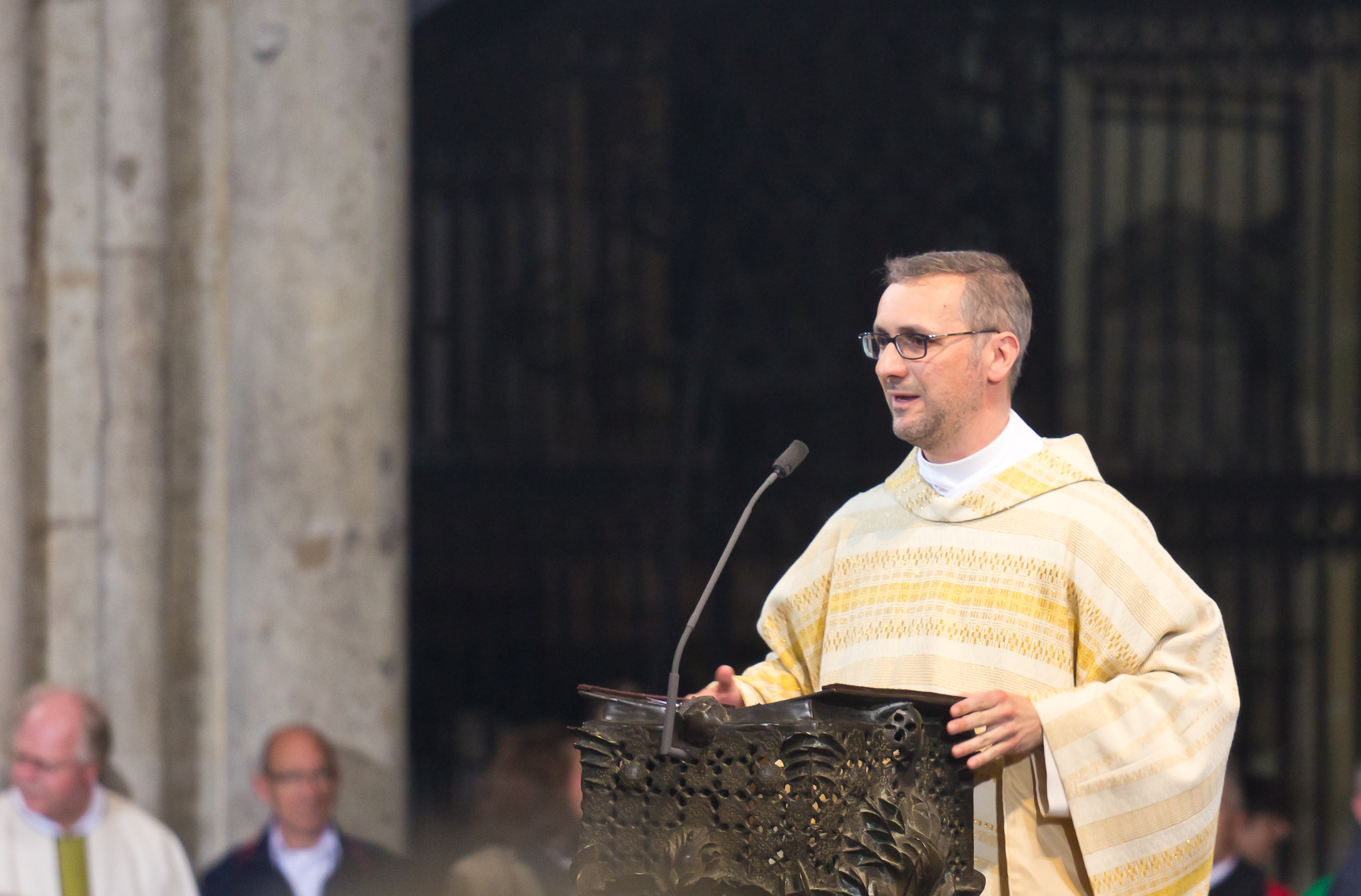
Heße welcomes those gathered in the Cologne Cathedral at Cardinal Woelki's consecration ceremony.

On 1 May 2006, Heße was appointed Deputy Vicar General of the Archdiocese of Cologne. On March 16, 2012, he became Vicar General.

On 28 February 2014, Cardinal Joachim Meisner, Archbishop of Cologne, resigned and Heße was elected diocesan administrator.

Ordination history of Stefan Heße
History
Episcopal consecration
- Principal consecrator: Franz-Josef Hermann Bode; Bishop of Osnabrück
- Co-consecrators: Cardinal Rainer Maria Woelki; Archbishop of Cologne; Norbert Werbs; Titular Bishop of Amaura

On 20 September 2014, Cardinal Rainer Maria Woelki was installed as Archbishop of Cologne. At the ceremony, Heße was reaffirmed as Vicar General.

=== Archbishop of Hamburg ===
Styles of Stefan Heße
- Reference style: The Most Reverend
- Spoken style: Your Excellency
- Religious style: Your Excellency

On 26 January 2015, Pope Francis appointed Heße the fourth Archbishop of Hamburg, following the retirement of Archbishop Werner Thissen in March 2014. His episcopal consecration took place on 14 March 2015, with his principal consecrator being Bishop of Osnabrück Franz-Josef Hermann Bode. Co-consecrators were Archbishop of Cologne Cardinal Rainer Woelki and Norbert Werbs, Auxiliary Bishop of Hamburg. At 48, he was Germany's youngest diocesan bishop.

In a September 2015 plenary council, the gathering of German bishops and other clergy focused most of the discussion on the European migrant crisis that had begun earlier that year. The plenary elected Heße as the German bishops' special envoy to the migrant crisis, which placed him in charge of the dioceses' response efforts. Among the resources placed at his disposal were 100 million euros from Catholic dioceses and charities. which were set aside as aid for refugees both in and outside of Germany, and 800 unused church-owned buildings, which were designated as housing for migrants.

On 18 March 2021, after an investigation into the handling of accusations of sexual abuse on the part of priests in the Archdiocese of Cologne criticized Heße, he announced he was submitting his resignation to Pope Francis.

In September 2021 Pope Francis rejected his resignation.

== Views ==
=== Environment and climate change ===
Heße commended Pope Francis' second encyclical, Laudato si'', which contains the pontiff's strong criticism for consumerism and irresponsible development and his lament for environmental degradation and global warming. In it, Francis calls for all people of the world to take "swift and unified global action." Heße praised the encyclical, calling it "valuable momentum for a worldwide ecological reorientation." He commented further, saying:

He makes it clear that urgent issues of the future for the whole world and for all human beings have to be solved. Without a radical change of mentality this will not happen. Thus he underlines that the problems that concern all, can be solved only by all.

In regard to the role of the Archdiocese of Hamburg, Heße said that "we do not have many opportunities for development in this area," but the archdiocese had established an energy fund in 2009 containing eight million euros, five million of which had already been invested at that point. The funding was spent on 90 projects in 70 locations in the archdiocese, with efforts including the improvement of heating systems and insulation, and a shift to green electricity in parishes. The archbishop admitted that it was not satisfactory that only 25 out of around 80 parishes in the Archdiocese of Hamburg relied solely on green energy.

=== Homosexuality and gay marriage ===
On 1 August 2015, Heße called for the Catholic Church to be more realistic in regard to teachings on sexual morality. He said:

We have to look upon the manifold ways and forms of living in which people live, as they now exist. Of course, [I see] same-sex couples entering the Metropolitan Cathedral of Hamburg, and nobody asking them to leave.

Despite this, he said that he was still hesitant about same-sex marriage. He made clear that the church needs to be available for all people, including gay people:

When these people seek to be close to us, then we as Church are there for them. What else? ...In my eyes, this does not minimize the love and fidelity between two people.

=== Marriage and family life ===
In a May 2015 interview, Heße spoke about his views regarding marriage and families:

"I believe that freedom does not consist of me leaving everything open and free and undetermined, but instead, that I choose and commit myself. Analogously, that is also the case in marriage. ...I can’t permanently keep all options open, but I am only happy when I can concretely commit myself to someone."

When asked if he ever wished to marry and have children, Heße responded:

I can imagine myself as a father. In all honesty, that was a topic during my studies. That was very clearly a question I had to ask myself. For me it is a comfort that I can also see myself as a husband or father. I would have found it harder if I had told myself, well, you’re unsuited to be a father or husband, so you may as well be a priest.

==== Divorce ====
In May 2015, Heße stated his opinions on divorce in an interview, saying:

In our understanding, I cannot get a divorce. Marriage exists until death separates the spouses. The idea is that I give myself fully and completely to a person and trust him or her fully and completely. That is a magnificent undertaking. I am happy that my parents are able to celebrate their golden wedding anniversary. Of course, I also know that marriages do fail.

On 1 August 2015, Heße announced that he wishes for remarried divorcees "livable forms for the Church's recognition and accompaniment," without giving up the ideal of marriage.

=== Priestly celibacy ===
When asked in a May 2015 interview if celibacy is a disincentive for young men considering the priesthood, Heße responded:

It is; many young people object [to it]. For me, celibacy is more of a liberation and an expression that I put everything on this one card, namely God.

When asked if celibacy was a relief for him, he said:

Yes, because I believe freedom does not consist of me leaving everything open and free and undetermined, but instead that I choose and commit myself. Analogously, that is also the case in marriage.

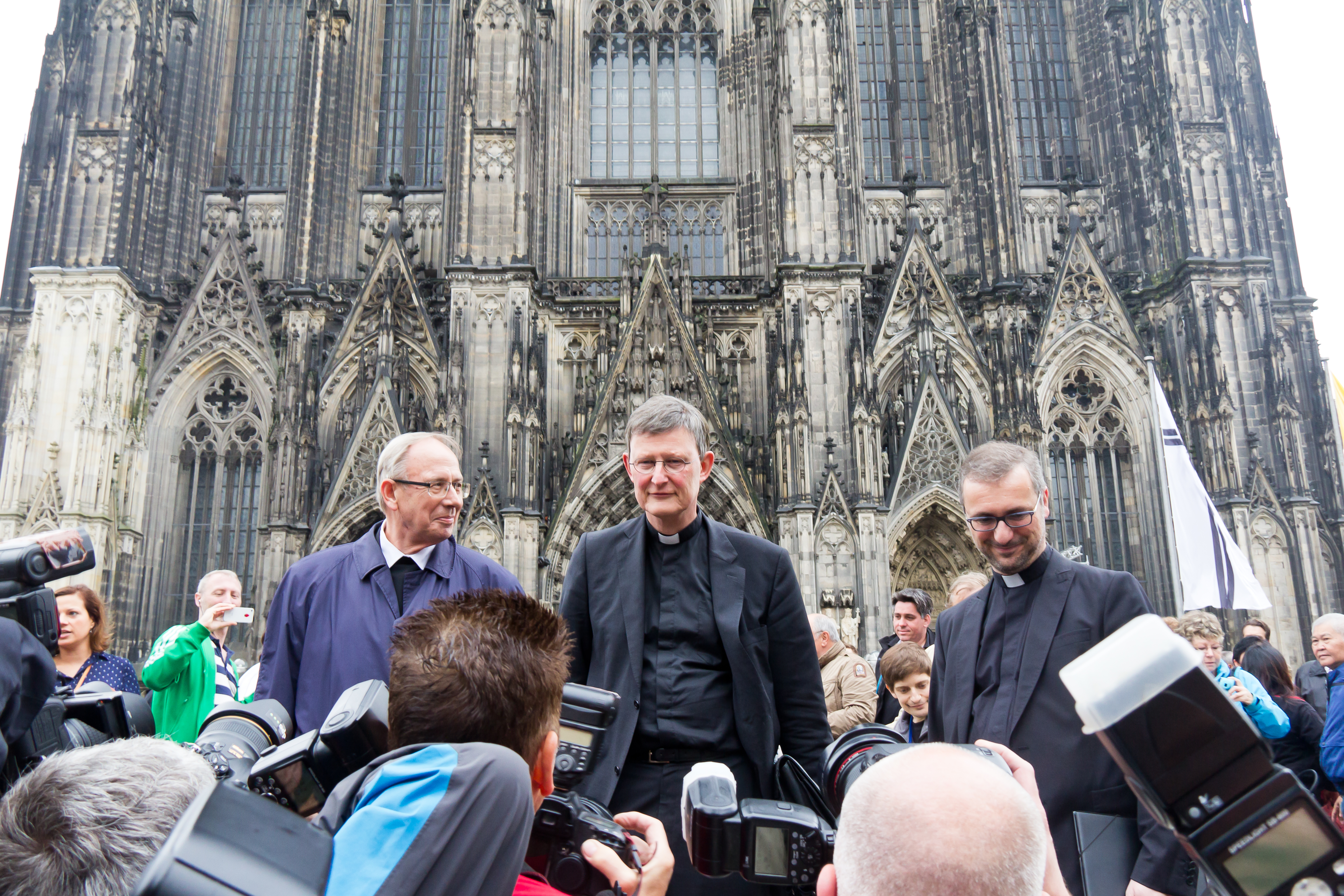
Cardinal Rainer Woelki with Heße at a press conference in 2015

=== Pope Francis ===
In a May 2015 interview, Heße said that he thinks Pope Francis is a "fascinating person, pioneering the way for the Church and today's world. Even evangelical Christians say, 'this is my pope.'"

=== Prayer ===
In a May 2015 interview with Norbert Vojta, Heße commented that "one of the best forms of prayer for me is silence." When asked to elaborate, he stated that:

"Prayer is having a relationship with God. I cannot have a relationship with God when I talk nonstop. Sometimes, I see couples in love who are overjoyed, and just hug. ...I can retreat into silence, into my soul. This is one of the most important parts of prayer that only comes to me with time, and then I come to God."

=== Church Labor Law reform ===
On 1 August 2015, Heße defended recent reform of the Catholic Church's Labor Law, and critiqued the position taken by some Bavarian bishops who have not fully implemented it, stating:

Otherwise, we could not keep going, because we could not find enough qualified employees, in order to be able to run our institutions. I ask myself, what kind of image of the Church stands behind this? Do we want to be a Church which has her place in the middle of the world? Then, we have to be close to the life of the people, and we have to try to take along as many as possible. Or do we want, so to speak, a "Church of the Pure", without existential difficulties and disruptions? That indeed would then be a small, a very small crowd [sic] which only would have very few points of contact with its surrounding.

=== Women ordination ===
In August 2020, Heße spoke in support of the ordination of women in the Catholic Church.

== Personal life ==
Heße is a fan of organ and classical music, and likes to attend concerts in the Laeiszhalle and the Elbe Philharmonic Hall.

He admitted to not being a football (soccer) fan, humorously telling an interviewer, "It would be the worst thing to pretend. That muse has not kissed me."

== Awards and honors ==
In 2005 Heße received the title Chaplain of His Holiness, and in 2010, the title of Honorary Prelate.
