= Tisili =

Tisili is a former city and diocese of in Roman Africa; it is now a Catholic titular see in modern Tunisia, with its precise location not being defined.

== History ==
Tisili was important enough in the Roman province of Africa proconsularis to become a suffragan bishopric of its capital Carthage's Metropolitan Archbishopric. It was however to fade with the city.

== Titular see ==
The diocese was nominally restored as a titular bishopric in 1933.

It has had the following incumbents, all of the lowest (episcopal) class :

- Américo Henriques (1966.07.03 – 1971.02.02), as Auxiliary Bishop of Lamego (Portugal) (1966.07.03 – 1967.04.15) and Coadjutor Bishop of Lamego (1967.04.15 – 1971.02.02); later succeeded as Bishop of Lamego (Portugal) (1971.02.02 – 1972.02.19), Bishop of Nova Lisboa (Angola) (1972.02.19 – 1976.04.13)
- José Manuel Estepa Llaurens, (1972.09.05 – 1983.07.30), as Auxiliary Bishop of Madrid (Spain) (1972.09.05 – 1983.07.30); later Archbishop Military Vicar of Spain (Spain) (1983.07.30 – 1986.07.21), Titular Archbishop of Velebusdus (1983.07.30 – 1989.11.18), promoted Archbishop Military Ordinary of Spain (Spain) (1986.07.21 – 2003.10.30), Titular Archbishop of Italica (1989.11.18 – 1998.03.07), created Cardinal-Priest of S. Gabriele Arcangelo all’Acqua Traversa (2010.11.20 [2011.04.29] – ...)
- Oscar Angel Bernal (1986.01.23 – 1988.06.18), as Auxiliary Bishop of Sonsón–Rionegro (Colombia) (1986.01.23 – 1988.06.18); later Bishop of Girardota (Colombia) (1988.06.18 – 1996.07.04)
- Hans-Jochen Jaschke (1988.11.18 – 2023.07.11), Auxiliary Bishop of Hamburg (Germany)

== See also ==
- Tišīlī (تشيلي), Arabic name for Chile
