= Johannes Fabri =

Johannes Fabri may refer to:

- Johann Fabri (printer) (died 1496), German and Swedish printer
- Johannes Fabri (bishop of Osnabrück), 15th century German Roman Catholic bishop
- Johannes Fabri (bishop of Paderborn) (died 1458), German Roman Catholic bishop
- Johannes Fabri (provost of Mühlberg) (died 1480), German Roman Catholic theologian
- Johann Faber (1478–1541), Catholic theologian known for his anti-Protestant writings
- Johann Faber of Heilbronn (1504–1558), German preacher
