= Meppen (disambiguation) =

Meppen is a large, historic town in north Germany.

Meppen may also refer to:

- Johannes Meppen (died 1496), Roman Catholic prelate
- Meppen, Coevorden, a small village in Drenthe, Netherlands (not to be confused with Meppel)
- Meppen, Illinois, an unincorporated community in Illinois, U.S.
