= Domkirche St. Marien =

St Mary's Cathedral
- The Cathedral Church of Our Lady
- Domkirche St. Marien
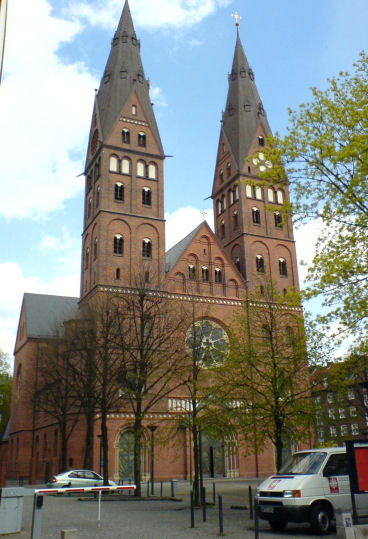
- Domkirche St. Marien in Danziger Straße, west front
- St Mary's Cathedral
- 53°33′27″N 10°00′49″E
- Location: St. Georg, Hamburg
- Country: Germany
- Denomination: Roman Catholic

History
- Founded: 1889
- Consecrated: 28 June 1893

Architecture
- Architect: Arnold Güldenpfennig
- Style: Neo-Romanesque
- Completed: 1893

Administration
- Province: Hamburg
- Archdiocese: Archdiocese of Hamburg

Clergy
- Archbishop: Stefan Heße

Domkirche St. Marien (English: St. Mary's Cathedral) is a Roman Catholic cathedral in Sankt Georg, Hamburg, Germany, and the metropolitan cathedral of the Roman Catholic Archdiocese of Hamburg (as of 1995). It was the first new Roman Catholic church built in Hamburg since the Reformation.

== History ==
The cathedral stands in Danziger Straße and was built between 1890 and 1893 to the designs of Arnold Güldenpfennig. The church was erected in Romanesque revival style at the instigation of Bishop Bernhard Höting of Osnabrück, then simultaneously officiating as Vicar Apostolic of the Vicariate Apostolic of the Nordic Missions of Germany, then competent for Hamburg's Catholics.

Güldenpfennig followed the design of the double tower front of Bremen Cathedral, as requested by Bishop Höting, probably in reference to St. Ansgar, who was archbishop of the double bishopric Hamburg-Bremen. The foundation stone was laid by Bishop Höting on August 15, 1890. Work was delayed during the summer of 1892 because of an outbreak of cholera. Public life in the city came to a halt, factories remained closed, and all work was stopped at the construction site. It was some ten weeks before work could resume. The new church was consecrated on June 28, 1893.

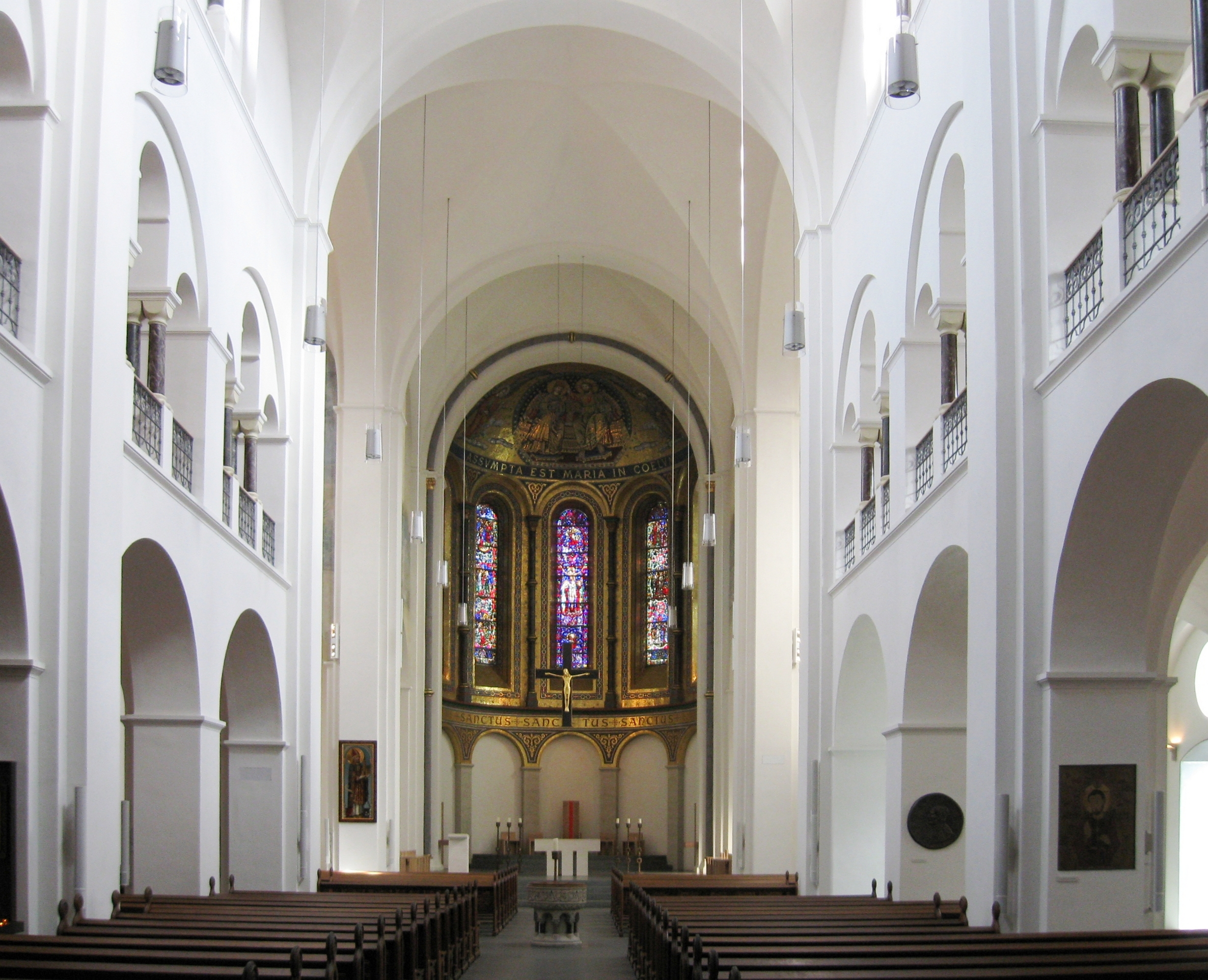
The interior of the Cathedral
