= Johannes Fabri (bishop of Osnabrück) =

German Roman Catholic prelate

Most Reverend Johannes Fabri
- Auxiliary Bishop of Osnabruck; Titular Bishop of Athyra
- Church: Catholic Church
- Diocese: Diocese of Osnabruck
- In office: 1434–1451

Orders
- Consecration: 30 Nov 1434

Johannes Fabri, O.F.M. was a Roman Catholic prelate who served as Auxiliary Bishop of Osnabrück (1434–1451).

== Biography ==
Johannes Fabri was ordained a priest in the O.F.M. On 20 Nov 1434, he was appointed during the papacy of Pope Eugene IV as Auxiliary Bishop of Osnabrück and Titular Bishop of Athyra. On 30 Nov 1434, he was consecrated bishop. He served as Auxiliary Bishop of Osnabrück until his resignation in Mar 1451. While bishop, he was the principal consecrator of Piotr Nowak, Bishop of Wrocław (1447); and the principal co-consecrator of Jakub Sienieński, Bishop of Krakow (1461).
