= Heinrich Schodehoet =

Most Reverend Heinrich Schodehoet
- Auxiliary Bishop of Münster; Auxiliary Bishop of Osnabruck; Titular Bishop of Tricale
- Church: Catholic Church
- Diocese: Diocese of Münster
- In office: 1494–1515
- Previous post: Auxiliary Bishop of Osnabrück (1494-1515)

Orders
- Consecration: 12 Jan 1494

Personal details
- Died: 1515 Münster, Germany

Heinrich Schodehoet, O.E.S.A. (died 1515) was a Roman Catholic prelate who served as Auxiliary Bishop of Münster (1494-1515) and Auxiliary Bishop of Osnabrück (1494-1515).

== Biography ==
Heinrich Schodehoet was ordained a priest in the Order of Saint Augustine. On 8 Jan 1494, he was appointed during the papacy of Pope Alexander VI as Auxiliary Bishop of Münster, Auxiliary Bishop of Osnabrück, and Titular Bishop of Tricale. On 12 Jan 1494, he was consecrated bishop. He served as Auxiliary Bishop of Münster and Auxiliary Bishop of Osnabruck until his death in 1515.
