= Ludwig Averkamp =

German prelate of the Catholic Church

- Archbishop of Hamburg
- Church: Catholic Church
- Archdiocese: Archdiocese of Hamburg
- In office: 24 October 1994 – 16 February 2002
- Predecessor: Theodor Hubrich
- Successor: Werner Thissen
- Previous posts: Bishop of Osnabrück (1987-1994); Coadjutor Bishop of Osnabrück (1985-1987); Titular Bishop of Thapsus (1973-1985); Auxiliary Bishop of Münster (1973-1985)

Orders
- Ordination: 10 October 1984 by Ettore Cunial
- Consecration: 24 February 1973 by Heinrich Tenhumberg

Personal details
- Born: 16 February 1927 Velen, Province of Westphalia, Free State of Prussia, Weimar Republic
- Died: 29 July 2013 (aged 86)
- Motto: Dominus Prope

Styles of Ludwig Averkamp
- Reference style: The Most Reverend
- Spoken style: Your Excellency
- Religious style: Monsignor
- Posthumous style: not applicable

Ludwig Averkamp (16 February 1927 – 29 July 2013) was a German prelate of the Catholic Church. He served as Bishop of Osnabrück from 1987 to 1994, and Archbishop of Hamburg from 1994 to 2002.

== Biography ==
Born in Velen, Averkamp was ordained to the priesthood by Archbishop Ettore Cunial on 10 October 1954.

On 18 January 1973 he was appointed Auxiliary bishop of Münster and Titular bishop of Thapsus. Averkamp received his episcopal consecration on the following 24 February from Bishop Heinrich Tenhumberg, with Bishops Heinrich Baaken and Laurenz Böggering serving as co-consecrators.

He was named Coadjutor Bishop of Osnabrück on 7 November 1985, and succeeded Helmut Wittler on 9 September 1987. Averkamp was later made the first Archbishop of Hamburg by Pope John Paul II on 24 October 1994; he was installed as such on 7 January 1995.

Averkamp resigned as Hamburg's archbishop on 16 February 2002 at the age of 75, after seven years of service. The Archbishop Emeritus was also a member of the European Academy of Sciences and Arts, in World Religions.

Catholic Church titles
| Preceded by Helmut Hermann Wittler | Bishop of Osnabrück; 1987–1994 | Succeeded by Franz-Josef Bode |
| New title Archdiocese newly established | Archbishop of Hamburg; 1994–2002 | Succeeded by Werner Thissen |
