= Felix von Hartmann =

German prelate

His Eminence Felix von Hartmann
- Cardinal, Archbishop of Cologne
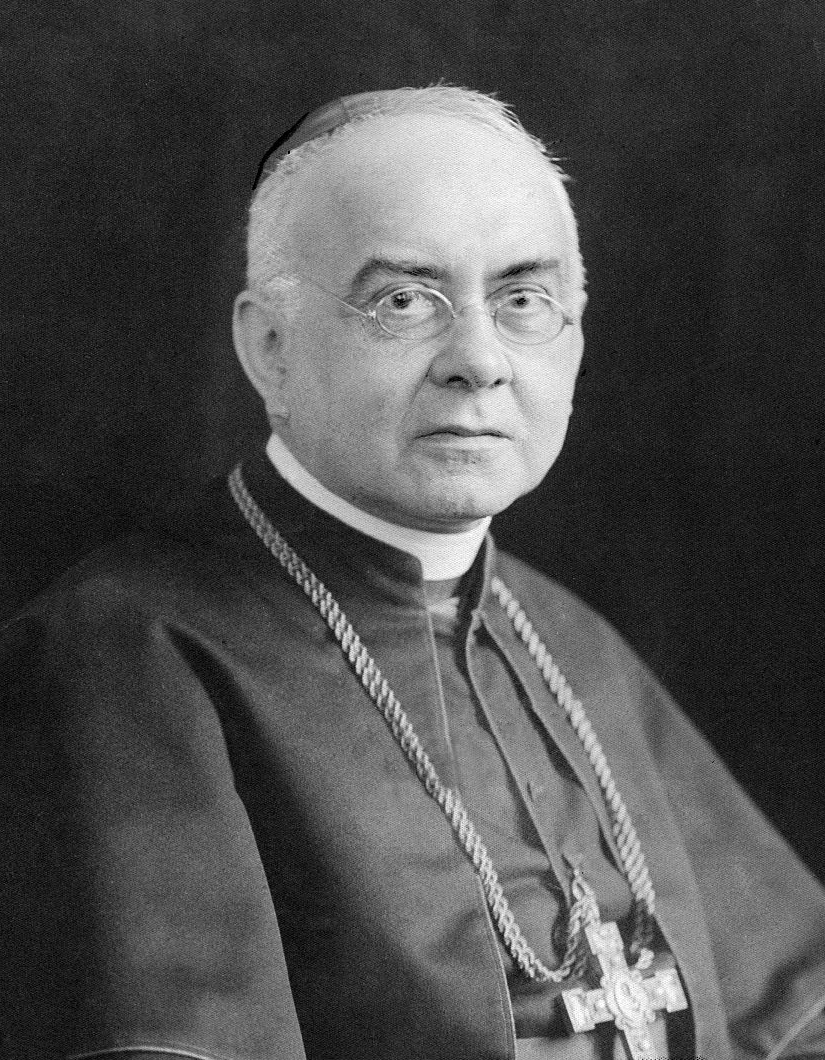
- Church: Roman Catholic
- Archdiocese: Cologne
- Installed: 19 April 1913
- Term ended: 11 November 1919
- Predecessor: Anton Hubert Fischer
- Successor: Karl Joseph Schulte
- Other post: Cardinal-Priest of San Giovanni a Porta Latina
- Previous post: Bishop of Münster (1911–1912)

Orders
- Ordination: 19 December 1874
- Consecration: 26 October 1911
- Created cardinal: 25 May 1914 by Pius X
- Rank: Cardinal-Priest

Personal details
- Born: 15 December 1851 Münster, Prussia, German Confederation
- Died: 11 November 1919 (aged 67) Cologne, Rhine Province, Prussia, Germany
- Buried: Cologne Cathedral
- Parents: Albert von Hartmann
- Coat of arms

Felix von Hartmann (15 December 1851 – 11 November 1919) was a German prelate, who was Archbishop of Cologne from 1912 to 1919.

== Life ==
Felix von Hartmann was born in Münster, the child of the second marriage of government official Albert von Hartmann. The family was close to the Westphalian aristocracy and served in a manner that was similar to that of traditional Prussian public servants.

After finishing his courses at Gymnasium Paulinum in Westphalia, he attended the Roman Catholic boarding school Collegium Augustinianum Gaesdonck, where Hermann Dingelstad, later Bishop of Münster, was his teacher. In 1870, he enrolled in a theological school in Westphalia, and on 19 December 1874, he was ordained a priest. Because the Kulturkampf ("culture war") made employment in Germany impossible. He went to Rome, where he joined the priest college at Santa Maria dell' Anima, and became Chaplain in the church Santa Maria dell'Anima, that was then the German national church in Rome. He simultaneously started his study of Canon law. In 1877, he earned the title of Dr. jur. can. (doctor of canon law) and returned to Westphalia in 1879, where he became a chaplain in the parishes of Havixbeck and Emmerich.

In 1890, he became secretary and chaplain to Dingelstad, by this time Bishop of Münster. He rose through the ranks of the Church by serving as counselor of the episcopal curia of Münich, 1895–1905; canon of the cathedral chapter of Münster, 1903–1905; vicar general of Münster, 30 October 1905 – 1911; dean of the chapter and vicar capitular, 1910; and protonotary apostolic ad instar participantium, 20 December 1907.

He was prepared, on the basis of royal nomination, to be promoted to the episcopate of Münster, where he was promoted to dean in 1911. Having a great influence on church politics because the bishop trusted him completely, he had a certain view concerning reforming Catholicism that even later he would never give up. Because his influence was well known, his election to the bishopric of Münster on 6 June 1911 surprised no one. Despite the royal government's disapproval of his ultramontane views, it was impressed by his wise and polite ways, his excellent manners and his noble descent. His papal confirmation followed on 27 July and then his ordination as bishop by the Archbishop of Cologne, Anton Fischer, on 26 October in Münster.

On 29 October 1912, von Hartmann was selected as Archbishop of Cologne. He was enthroned on 19 April 1913. On 2 May 1914, Pope Pius X made him a Cardinal. From 1914 to his death, he was the leader of the Conference of German Bishops in Fulda.

When he arrived in Cologne at the height of the labour union strike, his main concern were the Catholic workers' organizations. In that issue, he succeeded in assuming a flexible attitude, and in 1913, he also began openly endorsing the interdenominational trade unions. He found support for his stance in Cologne and other places, but many others considered his opinion to be a stab in the back. Cardinal Kopp even tried to block his creation as Cardinal because of that.

Often and certainly accurately described as patriotic and loyal to the monarchy, those around him always saw him as a political conservative because his restraint with reference to the Centre Party was self-explanatory. In addition, he did not support the abolition of the Prussian three-class franchise, a system that weighted votes according to how much tax one paid. That was because he feared that doing so would benefit the Social Democratic Party.

He was convinced of the legitimacy of the First World War and in 1915 went to Rome personally to explain the German government's view on the Belgian question. The risk-averse and conflict-shy Hartmann sought in that manner to escape at any price from Belgian Cardinal Mercier.

When Mercier then asked the German episcopate to acquit the Belgian population of the accusation of partisan warfare in 1916, Hartmann could be dissuaded only with difficulty from giving a public reply, which would have involved the episcopate in nationalist polemics.

In general, Hartmann cared for the cure of souls, for prisoners of war and for mercy for many foreigners who were sentenced by German war tribunals. Therefore, he travelled to the Western Front in the summer of 1916 and continued to maintain good contacts with Kaiser Wilhelm II even after the fall of the German Empire.

In mid-September 1919, Hartmann became ill with shingles on the left side of his head, which led rapidly to the paralysis of the left half of his face. In early November he contracted pneumonia as well, which led to his death in the early morning hours of 11 November in Cologne.

Hartmann is buried in the Cathedral of Cologne.

Catholic Church titles
Preceded by Anton Hubert Fischer	Archbishop of Cologne; 1912–1919	Succeeded by Karl Joseph Schulte
Preceded by Georg von Kopp	Chairman of the Fulda Conference of Catholic Bishops; 1914–1919	Succeeded by Adolf Bertram
Preceded by Hermann Jakob Dingelstad	Bishop of Münster; 1911–1912	Succeeded by Johannes Poggenburg
