= Johannes Wennecker =

German Roman Catholic prelate

Most Reverend Johannes Wennecke
- Auxiliary Bishop of Münster
- Church: Catholic Church
- Diocese: Diocese of Münster
- In office: 1454–1469

Personal details
- Died: 1469 Münster, Germany

Johannes Wennecker, also Johannes Wennecker der Ältere (died 1469), was a Roman Catholic prelate who served as Auxiliary Bishop of Münster (1454–1469).

He was ordained a priest in the Order of Saint Augustine. In 1454, he was appointed during the papacy of Pope Nicholas V as Auxiliary Bishop of Münster and Titular Bishop of Larissa in Syria. He served as Auxiliary Bishop of Münster until his death in 1469.

== See also ==
- Catholic Church in Germany
