= Werner Thissen =

German Roman Catholic prelate (1938–2025)

His Excellency Werner Thissen
- Archbishop Emeritus of Hamburg
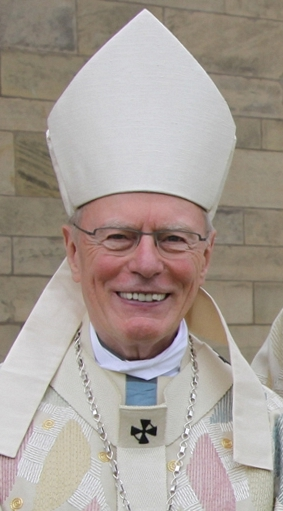
- Thissen in 2012
- Church: Catholic
- Archdiocese: Archdiocese of Hamburg
- Province: Hamburg
- Appointed: 22 November 2002
- Installed: 25 January 2003
- Term ended: 21 March 2014
- Predecessor: Ludwig Averkamp
- Successor: Stefan Heße
- Previous posts: Auxiliary Bishop of Münster and Titular Bishop of Scampa (1999–2002)

Orders
- Ordination: 29 June 1966
- Consecration: 24 May 1999 by Reinhard Lettmann

Personal details
- Born: 3 December 1938 Kleve, Gau Essen, Germany
- Died: 15 April 2025 (aged 86) Hamburg, Germany
- Motto: In Cristo Nova Creatura
- Coat of arms

Werner Thissen (3 December 1938 – 15 April 2025) was a German prelate of the Catholic Church. He was auxiliary bishop of the Diocese of Münster from 1999 to 2002, serving the Borken-Steinfurt region. He then served as Archbishop of Hamburg until 2014 when he resigned and became Archbishop Emeritus.

== Biography ==
Born in Kleve on 3 December 1938, Thissen achieved his Abitur at the Collegium Augustinianum Gaesdonck. He first studied economics at the University of Cologne. He then studied Catholic theology and philosophy at the University of Münster and at LMU Munich.

Thissen was ordained as a priest in Münster on 29 June 1966. He worked as a chaplain in St. Josef in Dorsten, then from 1969 as Spiritual at the Collegium Johanneum in Schloss Loburg in Ostbevern and from 1971 to 1977 Subregens at the seminary of the Diocese of Münster. He achieved the doctorate in theology with a dissertation about the Gospel of Mark in 1974. He worked from 1977 as head of the department Seelsorge (Spiritual care) in the administration of the diocese (Generalvikariat) and received the title Geistlicher Rat the same year. In 1984 he became a member of the cathedral chapter of Münster Cathedral. Bishop Reinhard Lettmann appointed him Vicar general in 1986. During this time, Thissen worked for ten years as a speaker of the ARD's weekly ecumenical broadcast Das Wort zum Sonntag.

Coat of arms as auxiliary bishop of Münster

On 16 April 1999, he was appointed auxiliary bishop of Münster and titular bishop of Scampa. Thissen received his episcopal consecration on the following 24 May from Bishop Lettmann, with bishops Alfons Demming and Heinrich Janssen serving as co-consecrators. He chose for his motto "In Christo nova creatura" (A new creation in Christ). He was responsible for the Borken-Steinfurt region. In a later interview from November 2019, he admitted serious mistakes related to sexual abuse in the Catholic Church during his time in office, and asked those who were abused for forgiveness.

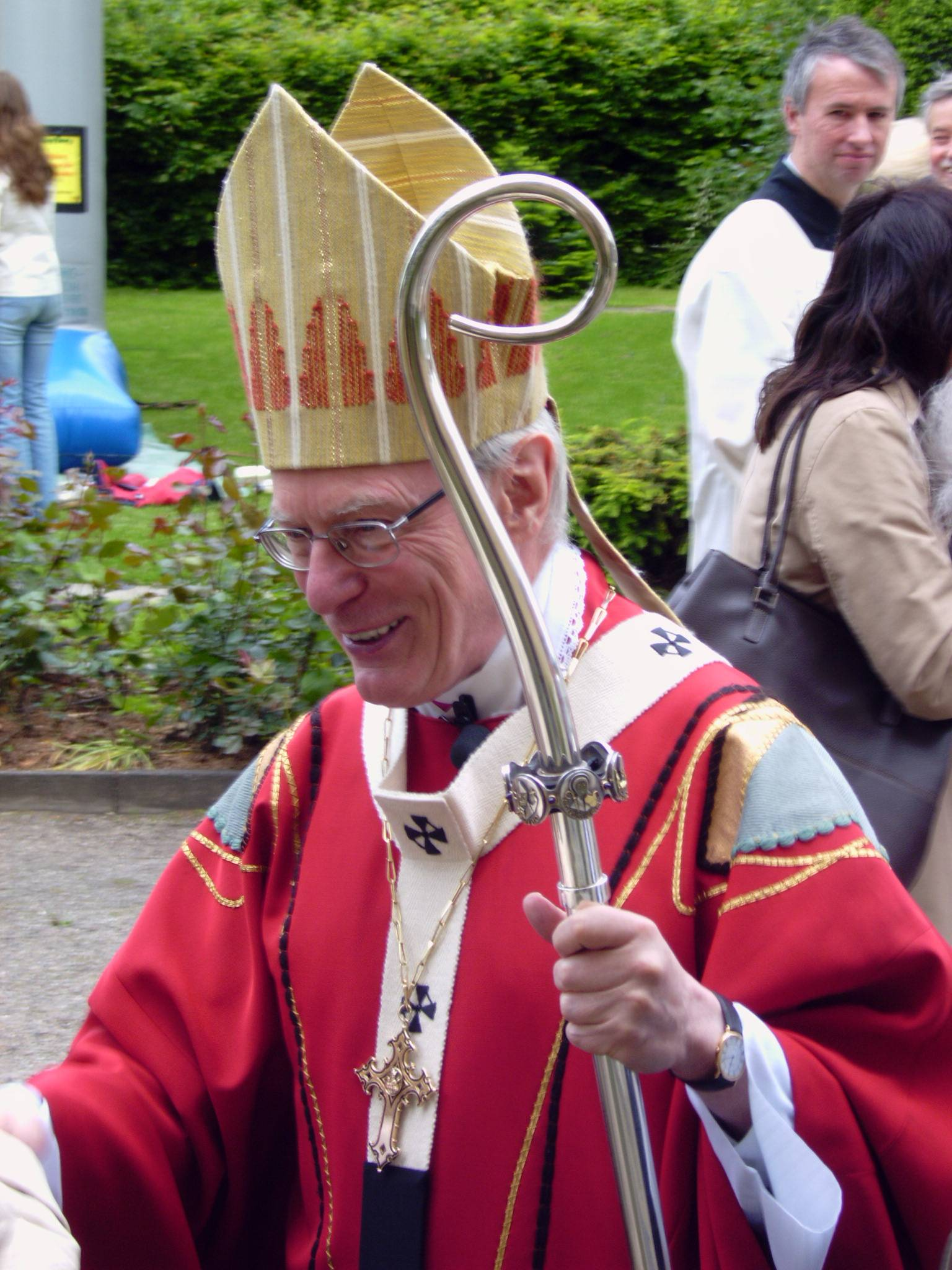
Thissen in 2007

Thissen served in the German Bishops' Conference as the bishop responsible for the Misereor aid agency from 2000 to 2014. He was named Archbishop of Hamburg by Pope John Paul II on 22 November 2002; he was installed on 25 January 2003. He is credited with the development of the young diocese. One of his initiatives was to call people to meeting each other in pastoral conversations titled Salz im Norden. He also worked for a restoration of the St. Mary's Cathedral, including new features. He initiated the process to beatify the Lübeck martyrs. Thissen resigned at age 75, which was granted by Pope Francis on 21 March 2014, and subsequently became archbishop emeritus of Hamburg.

Thissen died in Hamburg on 15 April 2025, at the age of 86.

Catholic Church titles
Preceded by Ludwig Averkamp	Archbishop of Hamburg; 2002–2014	Succeeded by Stefan Heße
Preceded by Sylvester Monteiro	Titular Bishop of Scampa; 1999–2002	Succeeded by Rainer Woelki
Preceded by —	Auxiliary Bishop of Münster; 1999–2002	Succeeded by —
