= Roman Catholic Diocese of Münster =

Catholic diocese in Germany

Coordinates: 51°57′47″N 7°37′32″E

Diocese of Münster Dioecesis Monasteriensis Bistum Münster (in German)

Catholic
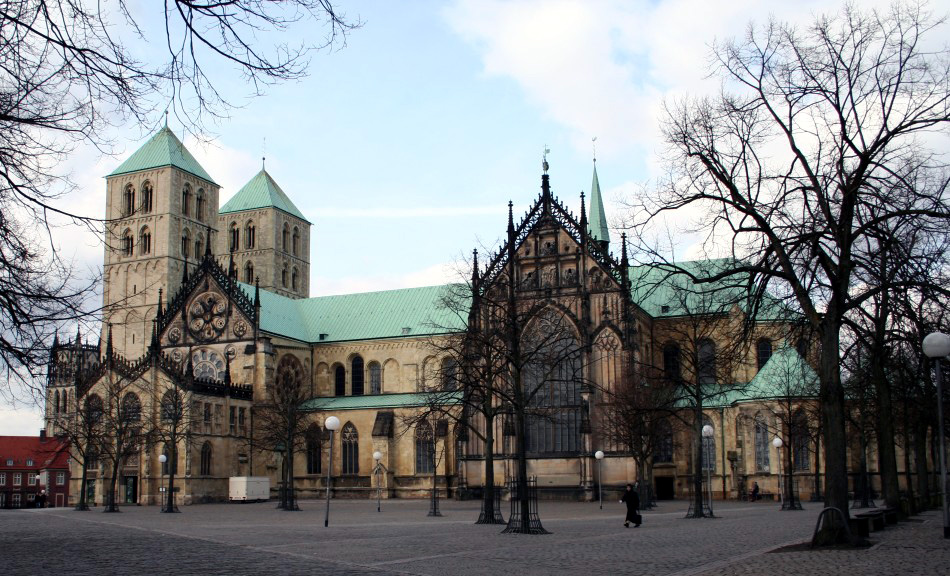
- Cathedral of St. Paul

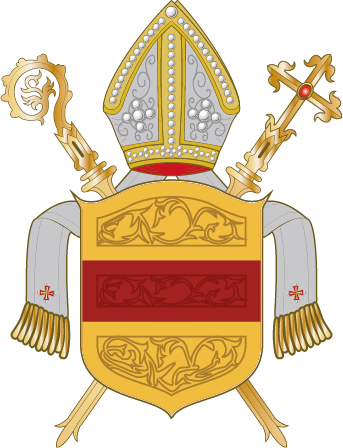
- Coat of arms

Location
- Country: Germany
- Ecclesiastical province: Cologne
- Metropolitan: Cologne

Statistics
- Area: 15,268 km^{2} (5,895 sq mi)
- Population: Total; Catholics: (as of 2014); 4,333,919; 1,953,081 (45.1%)
- Parishes: 304

Information
- Established: 800
- Cathedral: Cathedral of St. Paul
- Secular priests: 1,129

Current leadership
- Pope: Leo XIV
- Bishop: Heiner Wilmer
- Metropolitan Archbishop: Rainer Maria Woelki
- Auxiliary Bishops: Rolf Lohmann; Christoph Hegge; Wilfried Theising; Stefan Zekorn
- Bishops emeritus: Felix Genn; Dieter Geerlings (emeritus auxiliary bishop)

Map
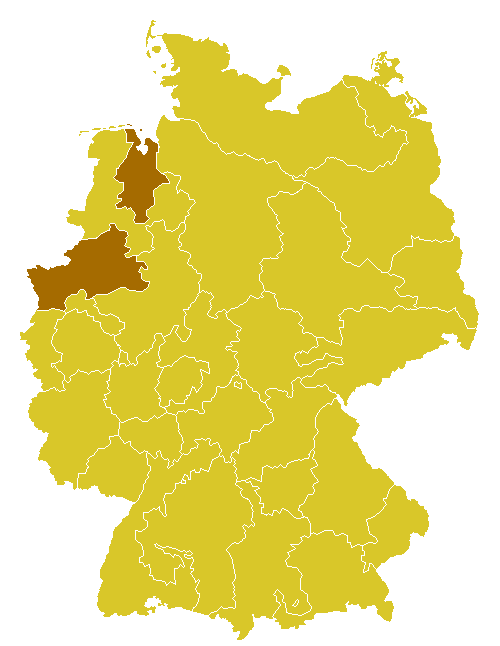

Website
- bistum-muenster.de

The Diocese of Münster (Latin: Dioecesis Monasteriensis) is a Latin Church ecclesiastical territory or diocese of the Catholic Church in Germany. It is a suffragan diocese of the Archdiocese of Cologne.

== History ==
The diocese was canonically erected in 800 by Pope Leo III. In 1803 the diocese was secularized by the Imperial Delegates Enactment and broken up into numerous parts. Freiherr von Fürstenberg administered as vicar-general the ecclesiastical affairs of the diocese even during the short supremacy of the French (1806-13). After his death, in 1810, the administrator was his former coadjutor, Clement Augustus von Droste-Vischering, later Archbishop of Cologne. In the years 1813-15 the diocese was administered, without the authorization of the pope, by Ferdinand August von Spiegel, arbitrarily appointed by Napoleon, and to whom Droste-Vischering had given his faculties by subdelegation.

The see had been vacant for twenty years when Ferdinand von Lunninck (1821-25), formerly Prince-Bishop of Corvey, was appointed. On account of illness, he left the administration to Jodok Hermann von Zurmühlen, already an old man, whom he made pro-vicar. The succeeding bishop was Kaspar Max, Freiherr von Droste-Vischering (1824-46), who, having been auxiliary bishop of the diocese since 1795, had confirmed many hundreds of thousands and ordained over 2200 priests. His administration was greatly hampered by the petty and far-reaching supervision of the Government. In place of the university, suppressed in 1818, he was able to open, in 1832, an academy with philosophical and theological faculties.

During the episcopate of John Gregory Müller (1847-70), fruitful popular missions were held in many places, many churches were rebuilt, and a large number of religious houses and benevolent institutions were founded with the active assistance of the laity. During the Kulturkampf Bishop John Bernhard Brinkmann (1870-89) suffered fines, imprisonment, and from 1875 to 1884, banishment. He witnessed the destruction of much that had been established by his predecessors and by himself.

In 1886 the old west tower of St. Lambert's Church, Münster was demolished and replaced.

It lost territory on 23 February 1957 to the newly established Diocese of Essen.

== Ordinaries ==
=== Bishops till 1181 ===
- Saint Ludger (805–809)
- Gerfried (809–839)
- Altfried (839–849)
- Liutbert (849–870)
- Bertold of Münster (870 – between 870 and 880)
- Wolfhelm of Münster (from before 882 – 888/889)
- Nidhard (899 – 921/922)
- Rumhold (922–941)
- Hildebold of Münster (941–969)
- Dodo of Münster (969–993)
- Swidger of Münster (993–1011)
- Dietrich I of Münster (1011–1022)
- Siegfried of Walbeck (1022–1032)
- Hermann I of Münster(1032–1042)
- Rudbert of Münster (1042–1063)
- Frederick I of Münster (1064–1084)
- Erpho (1085–1097)
- Burchard of Holte (1098–1118)
- Dietrich II of Münster (1118–1127)
- Egbert of Münster (1127–1132)
- Werner of Steußlingen (1132–1151)
- Frederick II of Are (1152–1168)
- Louis I of Wippra (1169–1173)
- Hermann II of Katzenelnbogen (1174–1203)

=== Prince-Bishops ===
- Hermann II of Katzenelnbogen (1174–1203)
- Otto I of Oldenburg (1204–1218)
- Dietrich III of Isenberg (1218–1226)
- Ludolphus of Holte (1226–1247)
- Otto of Lippe (1247–1259)
- William I of Holte (1259–1260)
- Gerard of the Marck (1261–1272)
- Everhard of Diest (1275–1301)
- Otto III of Rietberg (1301–1306)
- Conrad I of Berg (1306–1310)
- Louis II of Hesse (1310–1357)
- Adolphus of the Marck (1357–1363)
- John I of Virneburg (1363–1364)
- Florence of Wevelinkhoven (1364–1378)
- John II Potho of Pothenstein (1379–1382)
- Heidenreich Wolf of Lüdinghausen (1382–1392)
- Otto IV of Hoya (1392–1424)
- Henry II of Moers † ( 1424 Appointed – 2 Jun 1450 Died)
- Walram of Moers † (14 Jul 1450 Appointed – 3 Oct 1456 Died)
- Eric I of Hoya (antibishop 1450–1457)
- John of Palatinate-Simmern † (disputed; 11 Apr 1457 Appointed – 20 May 1465 Confirmed, Archbishop of Magdeburg)
- Henry III of Schwarzburg † (Apr 1466 Appointed – 14 Dec 1496 Died)
- Conrad IV of Rietberg † (18 Apr 1497 Appointed – 9 Feb 1508 Died)
- Eric II of Saxe-Lauenburg † (24 Feb 1508 Appointed – 20 Oct 1522 Died)
- Frederick III of Wied † (6 Nov 1522 Appointed – 24 Mar 1532 Resigned)
- Eric III of Brunswick-Grubenhagen † (27 Mar 1532 Appointed – 14 May 1532 Died)
- Francis I of Waldeck † (1 Jun 1532 Appointed – 15 Jul 1553 Died)
- William II Ketteler † (21 Jul 1553 Appointed – 2 Dec 1557 Resigned)
- Bernhard von Raesfeld † (4 Dec 1557 Appointed – 25 Oct 1566 Resigned)
- John III of Hoya † (26 Oct 1566 Appointed – 5 Apr 1574 Died)
- John William of Juliers-Cleves-Berg † (28 Apr 1574 Appointed – 18 May 1585 Resigned)
- Ernest of Bavaria † (18 May 1585 Appointed – 17 Feb 1612 Died)
- Ferdinand I of Bavaria † (18 Feb 1612 Confirmed – 13 Sep 1650 Died)
- Bernard von Galen † (14 Nov 1650 Appointed – 19 Sep 1678 Died)
- Ferdinand II of Fürstenberg † (19 Sep 1678 Succeeded – 26 Jun 1683 Died)
- Maximilian Henry of Bavaria (1683–1688)
- Friedrich Christian von Plettenberg zu Lenhausen † (29 Jul 1688 Appointed – 5 May 1706 Died)
  - Giovanni Battista Bussi (1706–1707), administrator
- Franz Arnold von Wolff-Metternich zur Gracht † (8 Jun 1707 Appointed – 25 Dec 1718 Died)
- Clemens August I of Bavaria † (26 Mar 1719 Appointed – 6 Feb 1761 Died)
- Maximilian Friedrich von Königsegg-Rothenfels † (16 Sep 1762 Appointed – 15 Apr 1784 Died)
- Maximilian Francis of Austria † (15 Apr 1784 Succeeded – 29 Jul 1801 Died)

=== Bishops since 1820 ===
- Anton Victor of Austria elect (1801, resigned after rejection by Prussia)
- Sede vacante (1801–1820)
- Ferdinand Hermann Maria Freiherr von Lüninck † (28 Aug 1820 Appointed – 18 Mar 1825 Died), Prince-Bishop of Corvey (1794-1825)
- Kaspar Maximilian Droste zu Vischering † (15 Jun 1825 Appointed – 3 Aug 1846 Died)
- Bernard Georg Kellermann † (10 Dec 1846 Appointed – 29 Mar 1847 Died)
- Johann Georg Müller † (1 Jul 1847 Appointed – 19 Jan 1870 Died)
- Johann Bernhard Brinkmann † (6 Apr 1870 Appointed – 13 Apr 1889 Died)
- Hermann Jakob Dingelstad † (15 Aug 1889 Appointed – 6 Mar 1911 Died)
- Felix von Hartmann † (6 Jun 1911 – 29 Oct 1912 Appointed, Archbishop of Cologne)
- Johannes Poggenburg † (7 May 1913 – 5 Jan 1933 Died)
- Bl. Clemens Augustus II von Galen † (5 Sep 1933 – 22 Mar 1946 Died)
- Michael Keller † (19 Jul 1947 – 7 Nov 1961 Died)
- Joseph Höffner † (9 Jul 1962 – 6 Jan 1969 Appointed, Coadjutor Archbishop of Köln {Cologne})
- Heinrich Tenhumberg † (7 Jul 1969 – 16 Sep 1979 Died)
- Reinhard Lettmann † (11 Jan 1980 – 28 Mar 2008 Retired)
- Felix Genn (19 Dec 2008 – 9 March 2025 Retired)
- Heiner Wilmer (26 Mar 2026 – present)

=== Auxiliary bishops ===
- Dietrich Schenk, O.F.M. (14 Jan 1394)
- Johann Christiani von Schleppegrell, O.S.A. (7 Jun 1428 – 8 Oct 1468)
- Johannes Wennecker, O.S.A. (1454–1469)
- Weribold von Heys, O.F.M. (10 Dec 1470 – 1477)
- Johannes Ymminck, O.S.A. (1472–1484).
- Heinrich Schodehoet, O.S.A. (8 Jan 1494 – 1515)
- Johannes Meppen, O.S.A. (1495 – 15 Nov 1496)
- Johannes Pictor Meler, O.S.A. (15 Jan 1518 – 1529)
- Bernhard von Sachsen-Lauenburg, O. Cist. (23 Mar 1519 – 1536)
- Johannes Bischopinck (26 Jan 1537 – 1547)
- Balthasar Fannemann (Waneman) (26 Aug 1540 – 8 Oct 1561)
- Johannes Kridt (16 Mar 1550 – 16 Sep 1577)
- Cunerus Petri (Jan 1580 – 15 Feb 1580)
- Godfried von Mierlo, O.P. (14 Mar 1582 – 28 Jul 1587)
- Nikolaus Arresdorf, O.F.M. Conv. (23 Nov 1592 – 28 Mar 1620)
- Johannes Pelking (Pelcking), O.F.M. Conv. (16 Dec 1619 – 28 Dec 1642)
- Johann Nikolaus Claessens (8 Aug 1622 – 1 Apr 1650)
- Johann Sternenberg (de Dusseldorf) (7 Oct 1647 – 1652)
- Bl. Niels Stensen (1680–1683)
- Johann Peter von Quentell (14 Aug 1699 – 13 Apr 1710)
- Wilhelm Hermann Ignaz Ferdinand von Wolf-Metternich zu Gracht (16 Sep 1720 – 28 Oct 1722)
- Ferdinand Oesterhoff, O. Cist. (20 Dec 1723 – 20 Jan 1746)
- Franz Bernardin Verbeck, O.F.M. Conv. (19 Sep 1746 – Dec 1756)
- Wilhelm von Alhaus, O.S.C. (2 Oct 1758 – 26 May 1794)
- Kaspar Max Droste zu Vischering (1 Jun 1795 – Münster 17 Dec 1825; Appointed Bishop of Münster)
- Klemens August Droste zu Vischering (9 Apr 1827 – 1 Feb 1836)
- Franz Arnold Melchers (21 Nov 1836 – 18 Feb 1851)
- Georg Anton Brinkmann (15 Mar 1852 – 7 May 1856)
- Johannes Boßmann (Bossmann) (25 Jun 1858 – 4 Aug 1875)
- Franz Wilhelm Cramer (13 Nov 1884 – 15 Mar 1903)
- Maximilian Gereon von Galen (16 Jul 1895 – 5 Nov 1908)
- Everhard Illigens (28 Feb 1909 – 2 Jan 1914)
- Theodor Kappenberg (27 Apr 1914 – 18 Sep 1920)
- Johannes Scheifes (7 Mar 1921 – 30 Oct 1936)
- Heinrich Roleff (7 Mar 1936 – 5 Nov 1966)
- Heinrich Gleumes (5 Oct 1948 – 26 Aug 1951)
- Heinrich Baaken (26 Jan 1952 – Mar 1976)
- Heinrich Tenhumberg (28 May 1958 – 7 Jul 1969, Appointed Bishop of Münster)
- Laurenz Böggering (25 Jul 1967 – 23 Feb 1979)
- Reinhard Lettmann (18 Jan 1973 – 11 Jan 1980, Appointed Bishop of Münster)
- Ludwig Averkamp (18 Jan 1973 – 7 Nov 1985)
- Max Georg von Twickel (18 Jan 1973 – 6 Jul 2001)
- Alfons Demming (6 Nov 1976 – 30 Apr 1998)
- Hermann Josef Spital (15 Oct 1980 – 24 Feb 1981)
- Josef Voß (Voss) (18 Mar 1988 – 16 Dec 2009)
- Wilhelm Wöste (6 Nov 1976 – 20 Dec 1986)
- Friedrich Ostermann (27 Jun 1981 – 18 Jul 2007)
- Heinrich Janssen (4 Jul 1986 – 31 May 2010)
- Werner Thissen (16 Apr 1999 – 22 Nov 2002)
- Heinrich Timmerevers (6 Jul 2001 – 29 Apr 2016)
- Franz-Peter Tebartz-van Elst (14 Nov 2003 – 28 Nov 2007)
- Franz-Josef Overbeck (18 Jul 2007 – 28 Oct 2009)
- Dieter Geerlings (31 May 2010 – 24 Nov 2017)
- Christoph Hegge (31 May 2010 – )
- Wilfried Theising (31 May 2010 – )
- Stefan Zekorn (3 Dec 2010 – )
- Rolf Lohmann (25 Apr 2017 – )

== Statistics ==
As of 31 December 2006, with 4.336 million adherents or 47.1% of local population, nearly half the inhabitants of the Münster diocese were Catholic; due to continuing secularisation, this a decreased percentage compared to earlier periods. Sunday Mass attendance reflects this decline over the course of three decades. Per the diocesan website: in 2005, 13.6% Catholics attended Sunday Mass; in 2004, this was 14.5%. A decade earlier, in 1995, Sunday Mass attendance was about 20% (416,406 churchgoers); in 1985, Sunday Mass attendance was 29.3% (614,839 Catholics); and, in 1975, Sunday Mass attendance was 35.1% or 787,582 persons. Over a 30-year period, Sunday Mass attendance declined over 50%.

As of 18 July 2013, there were 1,129 priests, 296 permanent deacons, and 2,540 religious in the diocese.

== See also ==
- Prince-Bishopric of Münster
- Roman Catholicism in Germany
