= Dietrich Schenk =

German Roman Catholic prelate

Most Reverend Dietrich Schenk
- Auxiliary Bishop of Münster; Titular Bishop of Athyra
- Church: Catholic Church
- Diocese: Diocese of Münster
- In office: 1394–?

Dietrich Schenk, O.F.M. was a Roman Catholic prelate who served as Auxiliary Bishop of Münster (1394–?).

== Biography ==
Dietrich Schenk was ordained a priest in the Order of Friars Minor. On 14 Jan 1394, he was appointed during the papacy of Pope Boniface IX as Auxiliary Bishop of Münster and Titular Bishop of Athyra. It is uncertain how long he served as Auxiliary Bishop of Münster; although, in 1404, he was the principal consecrator of Günther von Schwarzburg (archbishop), Archbishop of Magdeburg (1404).
