= Theologie und Glaube =

German academic journal

Theologie und Glaube is a German academic journal, published since 1909 by the Faculty of Theology Paderborn. As of 2020, the journal's editors are Bernd Irlenborn, Christoph Jacobs and Michael Konkel.
