= Wilho =

Surname list

Wilho may refer to

- Wilho Laine (1875–1918), Finnish politician
- Oskari Wilho Louhivuori (1884–1953), Finnish politician
- Wilho Saari, Finnish-American musician
- Wilho Sipilä (1858–1917), Finnish Lutheran clergyman
- Wilho Tilkanen (1885–1945), Finnish road racing cyclist
