= Anton Hubert Fischer =

German Roman Catholic Archbishop of Cologne and cardinal

His Eminence Anton Hubert Fischer
- Cardinal, Archbishop of Cologne
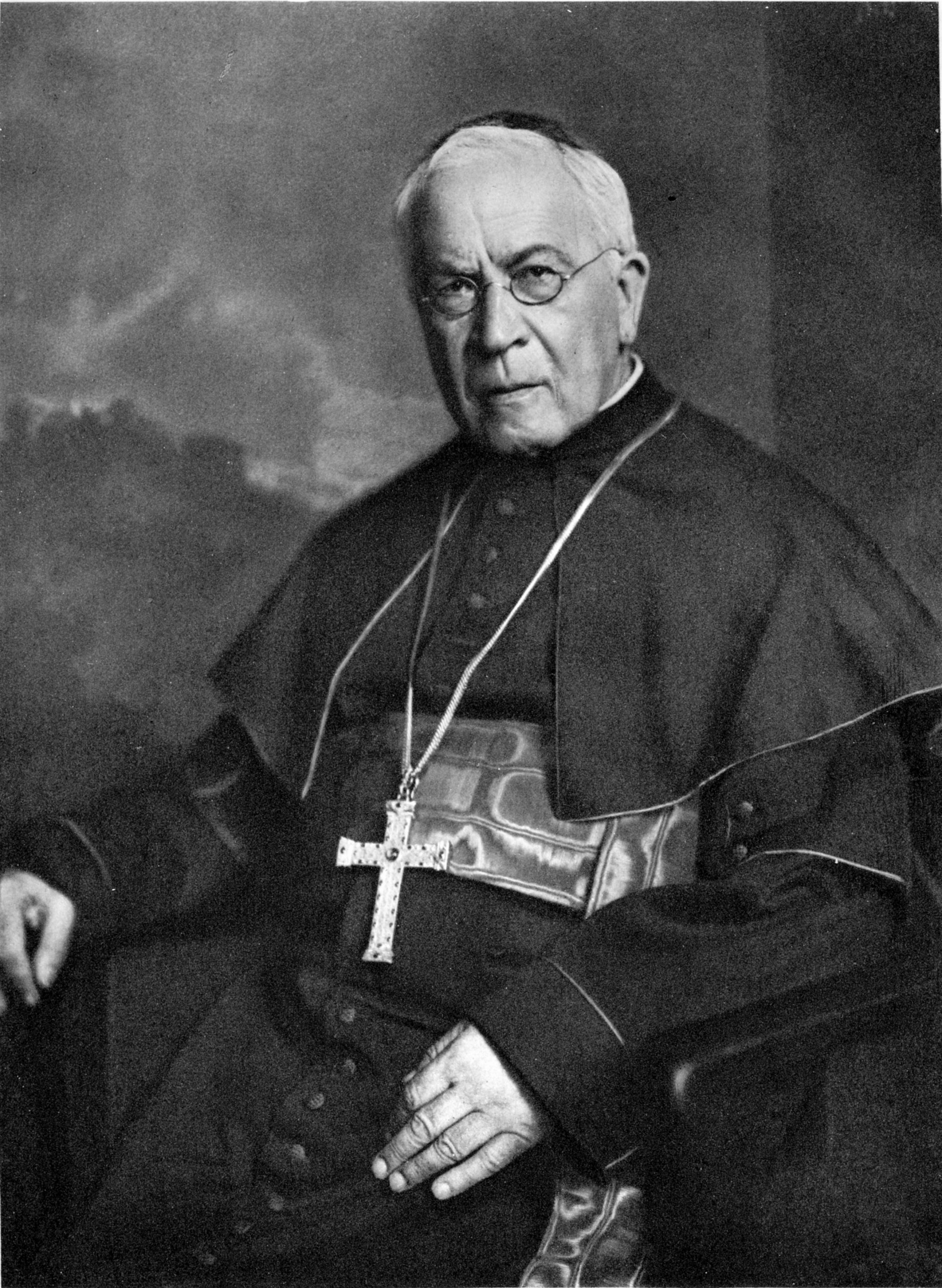
- Church: Roman Catholic
- Archdiocese: Cologne
- Installed: 19 March 1903
- Term ended: 30 July 1912
- Predecessor: Hubert Theophil Simar
- Successor: Felix von Hartmann
- Other post: Cardinal-Priest of Santi Nereo ed Achilleo
- Previous post: Auxiliary Bishop of Cologne (1889-1902)

Orders
- Ordination: 2 September 1863
- Consecration: 1 May 1889
- Created cardinal: 22 June 1903 by Leo XIII
- Rank: Cardinal-Priest

Personal details
- Born: 30 May 1840 Jülich, Kingdom of Prussia
- Died: 30 July 1912 (aged 72) Cologne, German Empire
- Buried: Cologne Cathedral
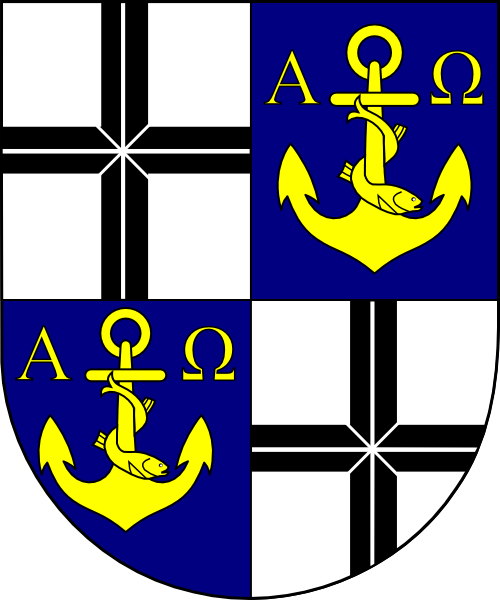
- Coat of arms

Anton Hubert Fischer (Antonius Fischer) (30 May 1840, in Jülich, Rhine Province – 30 July 1912, in Neuenahr) was a Roman Catholic Archbishop of Cologne and cardinal.

== Life ==
The son of a professor, he was educated at the Friedrich Wilhelm Gymnasium at Cologne, making his theological studies at the University of Bonn and the Academy of Münster. Ordained priest, 2 September 1863, he was for twenty-five years professor of religion at the Gymnasium at Essen. In 1886, he received his doctorate at the University of Tübingen, his thesis being De salute infidelium. He was preconized titular Bishop of Juliopolis, 14 February 1889, and was thenceforth associated in the administration of the Diocese of Cologne as assistant to the auxiliary Bishop Johann Anton Friedrich Baudri, then very old.

When Baudri died (29 June 1893), Fischer succeeded him, and in 1895 he became Dean of Cologne Cathedral. In 1902 the See of Cologne became vacant by the death of Hubert Theophil Simar, and Fischer was elected archbishop on 6 November 1902. On 23 June 1903, Pope Leo XIII made him a cardinal.

During the ten years of his episcopate, Fischer consecrated in the diocese several hundred churches and more than one thousand altars. He was a devoted protector of the religious orders. On several occasions during religious or national celebrations he spoke of Kaiser Wilhelm II in very warm terms, which caused much comment.

At the Congress of Liège in 1890, he called for the intervention of the state in matters of labour legislation. He declared that "aspiration towards progress, towards the betterment and preservation of earthly well-being is deeply enrooted in human nature and does not contradict the Christian moral laws." On 13 November 1905, he advised the Catholic miners assembled in Congress at Essen to co-operate with non-Catholic workmen in the discussion of common economic questions.

He was likewise the defender with the Holy See of Christian interdenominational syndicates, whose headquarters were at Mönchengladbach, and he exerted himself to counterbalance the influence brought to bear in behalf of purely sectarian syndicates by the Catholics of Berlin, the Bishop of Trier, and the Cardinal-Bishop of Breslau.
