= Johannes Meppen =

German Roman Catholic prelate

Most Reverend Johannes Meppen
- Auxiliary Bishop of Münster
- Church: Catholic Church
- Diocese: Diocese of Münster
- In office: 1495–1496
- Previous post: Auxiliary Bishop of Osnabrück (1477–1495)

Orders
- Consecration: 9 Feb 1477

Personal details
- Died: 15 November 1496 Münster, Germany

Johannes Meppen, O.S.A. (died 15 Nov 1496) was a Roman Catholic prelate who served as Auxiliary Bishop of Münster (1495–1496) and Auxiliary Bishop of Osnabrück (1477–1495).

== Biography ==
Johannes Meppen was ordained a priest in the Order of Saint Augustine. On 24 Jan 1477, he was appointed during the papacy of Pope Sixtus IV as Auxiliary Bishop of Osnabrück and Titular Bishop of Larissa in Syria. on 9 Feb 1477, he was consecrated bishop. On 24 Jan 1477, he was appointed during the papacy of Pope Nicholas V as Auxiliary Bishop of Münster. He served as Auxiliary Bishop of Münster until his death in 1469.
