= Archdiocese of Hamburg =

Catholic archdiocese in Germany

Coordinates: 53.5575°N 10.0136°E

Archdiocese of Hamburg Archidioecesis Hamburgensis Erzbistum Hamburg

Catholic
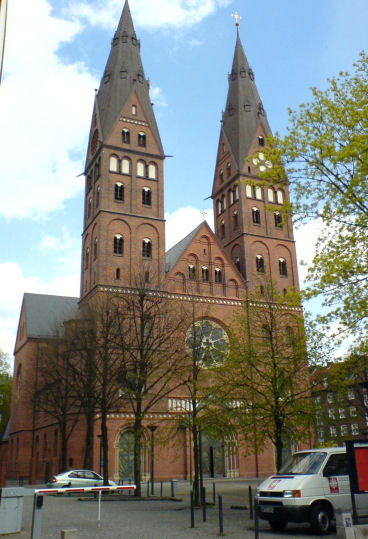
- Cathedral of Our Lady, Hamburg

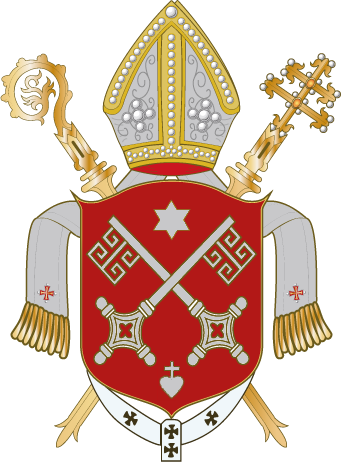
- Coat of arms

Location
- Country: Germany
- Ecclesiastical province: Hamburg
- Deaneries: 17

Statistics
- Area: 32,493 km^{2} (12,546 sq mi)
- Population: Total; Catholics: (as of 2019); 5,871,102; 398,425 (6.8%)

Information
- Denomination: Catholic Church
- Sui iuris church: Latin Church
- Rite: Roman Rite
- Established: 23 July 1973 (As Apostolic Administration of Schwerin); 24 October 1994 (As Archdiocese of Hamburg)
- Cathedral: Cathedral of Our Lady, Hamburg
- Patron saint: St Ansgar

Current leadership
- Pope: Leo XIV
- Archbishop: Stefan Heße
- Suffragans: Diocese of Hildesheim; Diocese of Osnabrück
- Auxiliary Bishops: Rev. Msgr. Horst Eberlein
- Vicar General: Rev. Ansgar Thim

Map
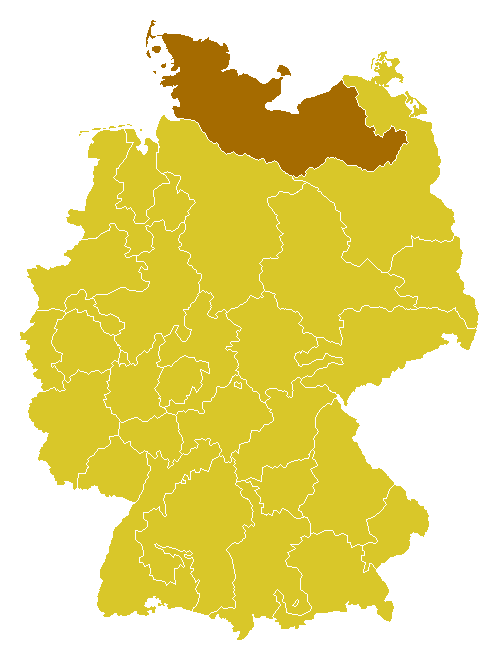

Website
- erzbistum-hamburg.de

The Archdiocese of Hamburg (Lat. Archidioecesis Hamburgensis; Ger. Erzbistum Hamburg) is a Latin Church ecclesiastical territory or diocese of the Catholic Church in the north of Germany and covers the Federal States of Hamburg and Schleswig-Holstein as well as the Mecklenburgian part of the Federal State of Mecklenburg-Vorpommern. In terms of surface area it is the largest in Germany. It is characterized by its situation as a diocese in the Diaspora. Seat of the archbishop is the New St. Mary's Cathedral in Sankt Georg, Hamburg. On January 26, 2015 Stefan Heße, Generalvikar of the Archdiocese of Cologne, was appointed Archbishop of Hamburg.

== History ==
In 831, Hamburg was elevated to an archbishopric by Pope Gregory IV and in 834 the Benedictine monk Ansgar was elected as the first archbishop. After the looting of Hamburg by Vikings, in 845, the archbishopric of Hamburg was united with the bishopric of Bremen, and the archbishop's seat was moved to Bremen. Still, there was a cathedral chapter in Hamburg with several special rights, which started to build St. Mary's Cathedral. The incumbents of the Hamburg-Bremen see are usually titled Archbishop of Hamburg and Bishop of Bremen between 848 and 1072, however, some later archbishops continued the tradition of naming both dioceses until 1258. During the Reformation the bishopric underwent steady deterioration and finally, with the Peace of Westphalia in 1648, it ceased to exist.

By the apostolic constitution Omnium Christifidelium of Pope John Paul II, of October 24, 1994 coming into effect on January 7, 1995, the archdiocese of Hamburg was erected again. Today it consists of territory that once belonged to the dioceses of Osnabrück, and Hildesheim, namely the Free and Hanse-City of Hamburg, the State of Schleswig-Holstein and the half-State of Mecklenburg. The cathedral and the vicar-general are seated in the city-quarter Sankt Georg which is located in the borough of Hamburg-Central.

== Ordinaries ==
- Ludwig Averkamp (24 October 1994 – 16 February 2002)
- Werner Thissen (22 November 2002 – 24 March 2014)
- Stefan Heße (26 January 2015 – present)
