= Franz-Josef Bode =

Roman Catholic bishop

Franz-Josef Hermann Bode
- Bishop Emeritus of Osnabrück
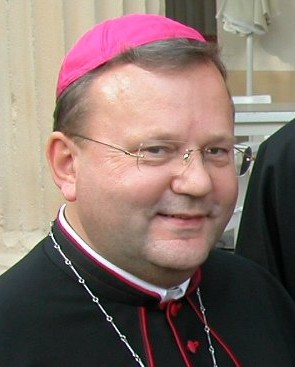
- Franz-Josef Hermann Bode in 2006
- Church: Catholic Church
- Diocese: Diocese of Osnabrück
- In office: 12 September 1995 – 25 March 2023
- Predecessor: Ludwig Averkamp
- Successor: Dominicus Meier
- Previous posts: Titular Bishop of Mattiana (1991-1995); Auxiliary Bishop of Paderborn (1991-1995)

Orders
- Ordination: 13 December 1975 by Johannes Joachim Degenhardt
- Consecration: 1 September 1991 by Johannes Joachim Degenhardt

Personal details
- Born: 16 February 1951 (age 75) Paderborn, North Rhine-Westphalia, West Germany
- Motto: Maior Est Deo Corde Nostro
- Coat of arms

Franz-Josef Hermann Bode (16 February 1951) is a German prelate of the Catholic Church who was bishop of Osnabrück from 1995 to 2023. He has been a bishop since 1991 and Deputy Chairman of the German Bishops Conference since 2017. Within that Conference, he is considered one of the strongest advocates of expanding the role of women in the Church.

== Biography ==
Bode was born in Paderborn, Germany, on 16 February 1951. He was ordained a priest on 13 December 1975 for the Archdiocese of Paderborn.

On 5 June 1991 he was appointed an Auxiliary Bishop of Paderborn and titular Bishop of Mattiana. He received his episcopal consecration on 1 September 1991 from Johannes Joachim Degenhardt and co-consecrators Hans Leo Drewes and Paul Consbruch. On 12 September 1995 he was appointed Bishop of Osnabrück and was installed on 26 November 1995.

From 1996 to 2010, he headed the German Bishops Conference's youth commission and since 2010 he has led the pastoral commission. In September 2017 he was elected Deputy Chairman of the German Bishops' Conference. He has withdrawn his name from consideration to succeed Cardinal Reinhard Marx as chairman of the conference, and his spokesperson noted that Marx thought it was time for younger leadership and that Bode is older than Marx and has health problems.

He was one of three bishops representing the German Bishops Conference at the Synod on the Family in October 2015.

In January 2018, he told an interviewer that the Vatican study commission on women deacons initiated by Pope Francis in 2016 "should not only proceed from tradition. We must do justice to the fact that today women are often in very responsible positions in the church". He also said he thought the Church should bless same-sex unions, though the Church does not call them marriages and "we would also not equate any blessing with the wedding ceremony".

In November 2019, Bode said he can imagine women in his diocese leading Eucharist services, but considers his hopes unrealistic; he has named a woman as a parish commissioner and plans to have women fill half of those positions.

On 25 March 2023, Pope Francis accepted his resignation as Bishop of Osnabrück. He had offered his resignation based on a September 2022 report that faulted his handling of charges of sexual abuse by clergy.

== Awards ==
- Courage-Preis - By the city of Bad Iburg, awarded to the best contributor to the common good
- Justus-Möser-Medaille - By the city of Osnabrück, awarded to the best contributor to the common good
- Honoris Doctor from University of Lucerne for his fight for women rights in Catholic Church

== Publications ==
- Zeit mit Gott. Ein Stundenbuch. Katholisches Bibelwerk, Stuttgart 2005, ISBN 978-3-460-28044-1
- Zeit mit Gott. Ein Stundenbuch II. Katholisches Bibelwerk, Stuttgart 2008, ISBN 978-3-460-28077-9
- Priester: Wurzeln und Visionen einer spannenden Berufung. Osnabrück 2009. ISBN 978-3-925164-46-0
