= List of bishops of Osnabrück =

The Bishop of Osnabrück is the ordinary of the Roman Catholic Diocese of Osnabrück, the current incumbent is Franz-Josef Hermann Bode. Theodor Kettmann is his auxiliary bishop.

== List of bishops ==
=== Early bishops ===
- Wiho I. ( Wicho I) 783 to 1. April 809
- Meginhard 810 to 12. April 829
- Goswin 829–845
- Gosbert 845 to 11. April 860
- Eckbert 860 to 1. February 887
- Egilmar 887 to 11. May 906
- Bernhard I. 906–918
- Dodo I. 918 to 14. May 949
- Drogo 949 to 7. November 967
- Ludolf 967 to 31. March 978
- Dodo II. 978 to 12. April 996
  - Kuno 978–980 (counter-bishop)
- Günther 996 to 27. November 1000
- Wodilulf 998 to 17. February 1003
- Dietmar 1003 to 18. June 1022
- Meginher 1023 to 10. December 1027
- Gozmar 1028 to 10. December 1036
- Alberich 1036 to 19. April 1052
- Benno I. (Werner) 1052–03. December 1067
- Benno II (Bernhard) 1068 to 27 July 1088
- Marquard 1088–1093
- Wicho II. 1093 to 21. April 1101
- Johann I. 1101 to 13. July 1109
- Gottschalk von Diepholz 1109 to 1. January 1119
- Diethard 1119–1137
  - Konrad 1119–1125 (counter-bishop)
- Udo von Steinfurt 1137 to 28. June 1141
- Philipp von Katzenelnbogen 1141 to 15. June 1173
  - Wezel 1141 (counter-bishop)
- Arnold von Altena 1173–1190
- Gerhard I. von Oldenburg-Wildeshausen 1190–1216
- Adolf von Tecklenburg 1216–1224

=== Prince-bishops ===
Prince-Bishops of Osnabrück include:

- 1224–1226: Engelbert I von Isenberg
- 1206–1227: Otto I
- 1227–1239: Konrad I von Velber
- 1239–1250: Engelbert I von Isenberg
- 1251–1258: Bruno von Isenberg
- 1259–1264: Balduin von Rüssel
- 1265–1269: Widukind von Waldeck
- 1270–1297: Konrad von Rietberg
- 1297–1308: Ludwig von Ravensberg
- 1309–1320: Engelbert II von Weyhe
- 1321–1349: Gottfried von Arnsberg
- 1350–1366: Johann II Hoet
- 1366–1376: Melchior von Braunschweig-Grubenhagen
- 1376–1402: Dietrich of Horne
- 1402–1410: Henry I of Schauenburg-Holstein
- 1410–1424: Otto von Hoya
- 1424–1437: Johann III von Diepholz
- 1437–1442: Erich von Hoya
- 1442–1450: Heinrich von Moers
- 1450–1454: Albert von Hoya
- 1454–1455: Rudolf von Diepholz
- 1455–1482: Konrad III von Diepholz
- 1482–1508: Konrad IV von Rietberg
- 1508–1532: Eric of Brunswick-Grubenhagen
- 1532–1553: Franz von Waldeck (Lutheran after 1543)
- 1553–1574: Johann II von Hoya (Catholic)
- 1574–1585: Henry II of Saxe-Lauenburg (Lutheran)
- 1585–1591: Bernhard von Waldeck (Lutheran)
- 1591–1623: Philip Sigismund of Brunswick-Wolfenbüttel (Lutheran)
- 1623–1625: Eitel Frederick von Hohenzollern-Sigmaringen (Catholic)
- 1625–1634: Franz Wilhelm von Wartenberg (Catholic)
- 1634–1648: Gustav Gustavsson af Vasaborg (Lutheran)
- 1648–1661: Franz Wilhelm von Wartenberg (Catholic)
- 1662–1698: Ernest Augustus, Elector of Brunswick-Lüneburg (Lutheran)
- 1698–1715: Charles Joseph of Lorraine (Catholic)
- 1715–1728: Ernest Augustus, Duke of York and Albany (Lutheran)
- 1728–1761: Klemens August of Bavaria (Catholic)
- 1764–1802: Prince Frederick, Duke of York and Albany (Lutheran), last Prince-Bishop

The prince-bishopric was mediatized in 1803 to the Electorate of Hanover. For Catholic bishops after the mediatization, see Roman Catholic Diocese of Osnabrück.

=== Modern bishops ===
- Paul Ludolf Melchers (1857-1866)
- Johannes Heinrich Beckmann (1866-1878)
- Johann Bernard Höting (1882-1898)
- Heinrich Hubert Aloysius Voß (1899-1914)
- Hermann Wilhelm Berning (1914-1955)
- Gerhard Franz Demann (March 3, 1957)
- Helmut Hermann Wittler (1957-1987)
- Ludwig Averkamp (1987-1994)
- Franz-Josef Bode (1995-2023)
