= Archdiocese of Cologne =

Roman Catholic ecclesiastical territory in Germany

Coordinates: 50.9413°N 6.9582°E

Archdiocese of Cologne Archidioecesis Coloniensis Erzbistum Köln

Catholic
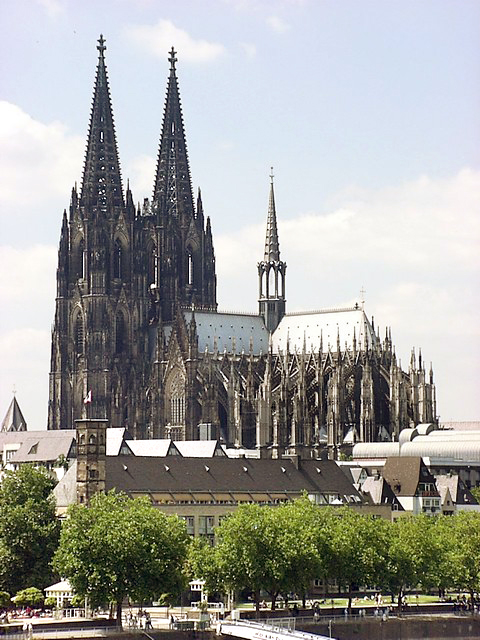
- Cologne Cathedral

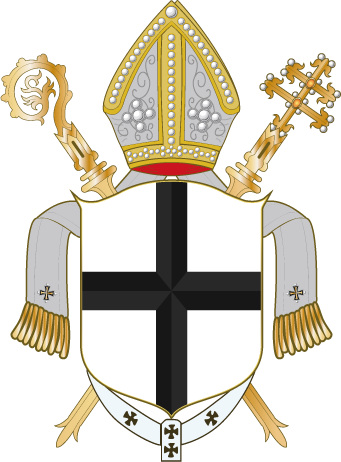
- Coat of arms

Location
- Country: Germany
- Ecclesiastical province: Cologne
- Metropolitan: Cologne, North Rhine-Westphalia

Statistics
- Area: 6,181 km^{2} (2,386 sq mi)
- Population: Total; Catholics: (as of 2021); ▲5,522,000; ▼1,738,000 (▼31.5%)
- Parishes: 514

Information
- Denomination: Catholic Church
- Sui iuris church: Latin Church
- Rite: Roman Rite
- Established: 313
- Cathedral: Cologne Cathedral
- Patron saint: Saint Joseph; Immaculate Conception

Current leadership
- Pope: Leo XIV
- Archbishop: Rainer Woelki
- Auxiliary Bishops: Dominik Schwaderlapp; Ansgar Puff; Rolf Steinhauser
- Vicar General: Guido Assmann

Map
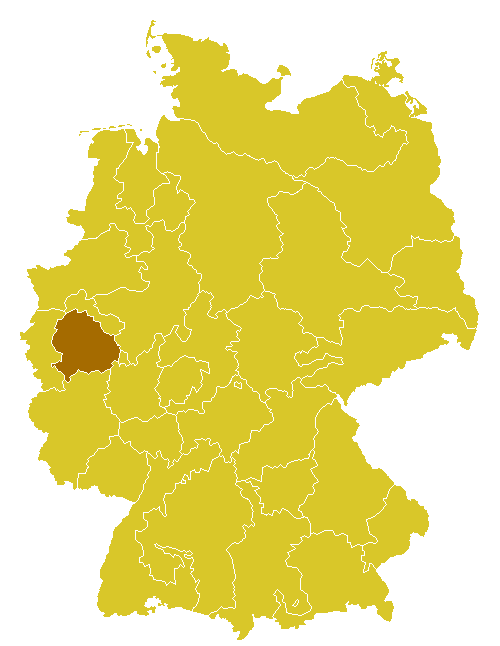

Website
- erzbistum-koeln.de (German)

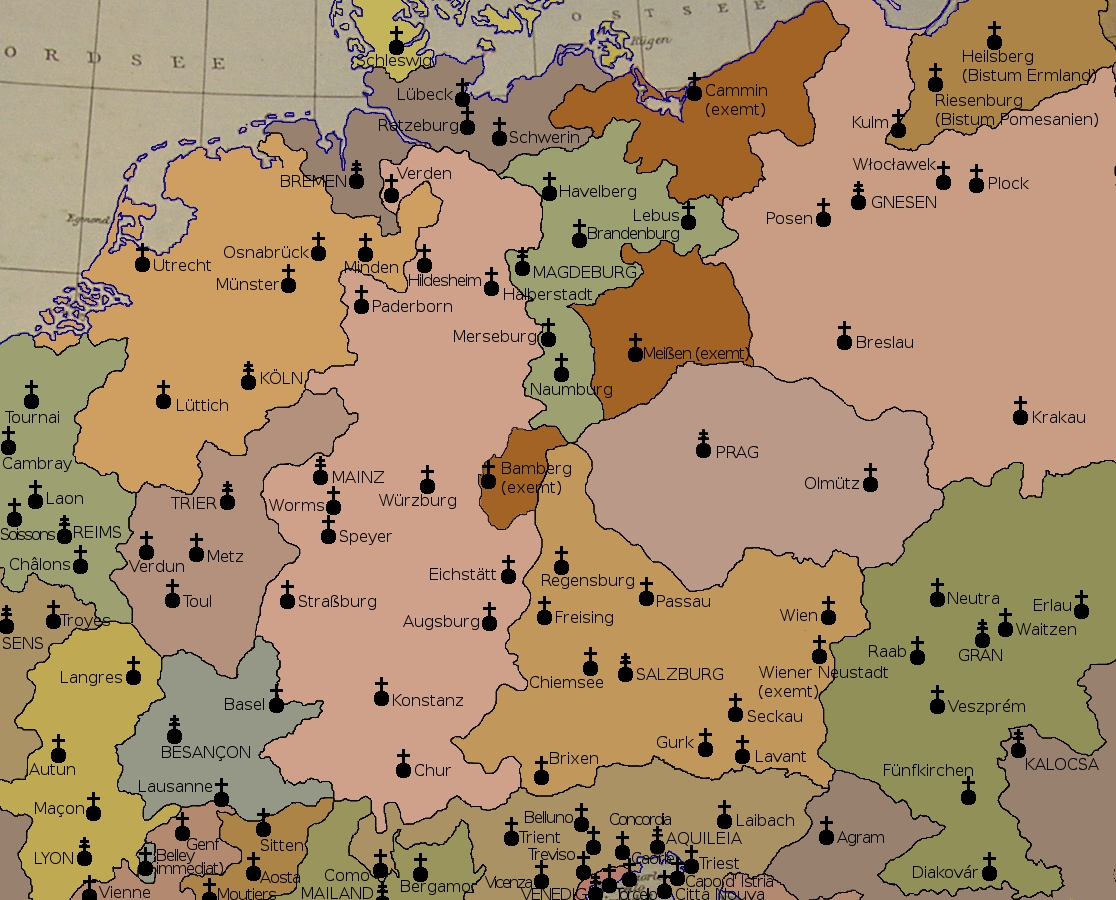
The archdioceses of Central Europe, 1500. The archdiocese of Cologne was larger than the Electorate of the same name and included suffragant dioceses. In Germany, the territory of the dioceses and archdioceses (spiritual) was usually much larger than the prince-bishoprics and archbishoprics/electorates (temporal), ruled by the same individual.

The Archdiocese of Cologne (Latin: Archidioecesis Coloniensis; German: Erzbistum Köln) is a Latin Church archdiocese of the Catholic Church in western North Rhine-Westphalia and northern Rhineland-Palatinate in Germany.

== History ==
At an early date Christianity came to Cologne with the Roman soldiers and traders. According to Irenaeus of Lyons, it was a bishop's see as early as the second century. However, Saint Maternus, a contemporary of Constantine I, is the first historically certain bishop of Cologne. As a result of its favourable situation, the city survived the stormy period around the fall of the Western Roman Empire. When the Franks took possession of the country in the fifth century, it became a royal residence. On account of the services of the bishops to the Merovingian kings, the city was to have been the metropolitan see of Saint Boniface, but Mainz was chosen, for unknown reasons, and Cologne did not become an archbishopric until the time of Charlemagne. The city suffered heavily from Viking invasions, especially in the autumn of 881, but recovered quickly from these calamities, especially during the reign of the Ottonian emperors.

From the mid-13th century, the Electorate of Cologne—not to be confused with the larger Archdiocese of Cologne—was one of the major ecclesiastical principalities of the Holy Roman Empire. The city of Cologne as such became a free city in 1288 and the archbishop eventually moved his residence from Cologne Cathedral to Bonn to avoid conflicts with the Free City, which escaped his jurisdiction.

From the 1583 appointment of Ernest of Bavaria as archbishop to the 1761 death of Clemens August of Bavaria, the archbishop was invariably a junior son of the Bavarian branch of the House of Wittelsbach.

After 1795, the archbishopric's territories on the left bank of the Rhine were occupied by France, and were formally annexed in 1801. The Reichsdeputationshauptschluss of 1803 secularized the rest of the archbishopric, giving the Duchy of Westphalia to the Landgraviate of Hesse-Darmstadt. As an ecclesial government, however, the archdiocese remained (more or less) intact: while she lost the left bank including the episcopal city itself, Cologne, to the new Diocese of Aachen established under Napoleon's auspices, there still remained a substantial amount of territory on the right bank of the Rhine. After the death of the last Elector-Archbishop in 1801, the see was vacant for 23 years, being governed by vicar capitular Johann Herrmann Joseph v. Caspars zu Weiss and, after his death, by Johann Wilhelm Schmitz. In 1821, the archdiocese regained Cologne and the right bank of the Rhine (though with a new circumscription reflecting the Prussian subdivisions) and, in 1824, an archbishop was established there again. It remains an archdiocese to the present day, considered the most important one of Germany.

== Finances ==
Cologne, the largest (in terms of inhabitants non-Catholics included) and reportedly richest diocese in Europe, announced in October 2013 that "in connection with the current discussion about Church finances" that its archbishop had reserves amounting to 166.2 million Euro in 2012. It said the 9.6 million Euro earnings from its investments were, as in previous years, added to the diocesan budget of 939 million Euro in 2012, three-quarters of which was financed by the "church tax" levied on churchgoers. In 2015 the archdiocese for the first time published its financial accounts, which show assets worth more than £2bn. Documents posted on the archdiocesan website showed assets of €3.35bn (£2.5bn) at the end of 2013. Some € 2.4 billion (£1.8bn) were invested in stocks, funds and company holdings. A further €646m (£475m) were held in tangible assets, mostly property. Cash reserves and outstanding loans amounted to about €287m (£211m).

== List of archbishops of Cologne since 1824 ==
The following is a list of the archbishops since the Archdiocese of Cologne was re-filled in 1824.

- 1824–1835: Ferdinand August von Spiegel
- 1835–1845: Clemens August von Droste-Vischering
- 1845–1864: Cardinal Johannes von Geissel
- 1866–1885: Cardinal Paul Ludolf Melchers
- 1885–1899: Cardinal Philipp Krementz
- 1899–1912: Hubert Theophil Simar
- 1902–1912: Cardinal Anton Hubert Fischer
- 1912–1919: Cardinal Felix von Hartmann
- 1920–1941: Cardinal Karl Joseph Schulte
- 1942–1969: Cardinal Josef Frings
- 1969–1987: Cardinal Joseph Höffner
- 1989–2014: Cardinal Joachim Meisner
- 2014– : Cardinal Rainer Woelki
