= Hermann V =

Hermann V may refer to:

- Hermann V, Margrave of Baden-Baden (died 1243)
- Hermann V von Wied (1477–1552)
