= Friedrich IV of Wied =

- Archbishop of Cologne
- Church: Roman Catholic Church
- Archdiocese: Cologne
- See: Cologne
- Appointed: 1562
- Term ended: 1567

Personal details
- Born: 1518
- Died: 23 December 1568 (aged 49–50)

Friedrich IV of Wied (German: Friedrich IV von Wied) (1518–1568) was the Archbishop-Elector of Cologne from 1562 to 1567.

== Biography ==
Friedrich IV of Wied was born in 1518, the son of Graf Johann II of Wied and his wife Elisabeth of Nassau-Dillenburg.

Friedrich's parents groomed him for a life in the church from a young age. He became dean of the Stift of St Cassius at Bonn Minster in 1534. On 31 August 1537 he became a canon of Cologne Cathedral. He later held a number of offices in the Cologne cathedral chapter, including provost (1546); Chorbischof (elected 12 December 1548); Thesaurar (elected 3 July 1549); assistant dean (elected 23 August 1558); and dean (elected 23 November 1558).

On 19 November 1562, the cathedral chapter elected Friedrich as the new Archbishop of Cologne. Friedrich, however, refused to take the oath approving the Council of Trent (the so-called Professio fidei Tridentina), not on religious grounds, but because he saw it as an affront to a reigning sovereign. Pope Pius IV therefore refused to confirm Friedrich's election as Archbishop. Although he was frequently denounced as a secret Protestant in the circles around the pope (one of his predecessors, his uncle Hermann of Wied, had in fact converted to Protestantism), Friedrich rebuffed efforts by Protestant princes to have him introduce Protestantism in the Electorate of Cologne.

Pope Pius V continued Pius IV's policy of refusing to confirm Friedrich as Archbishop of Cologne if Friedrich would not swear the Professio fidei Tridentina and threatened to withdraw the cathedral chapter's right to select the Archbishop of Cologne. He ordered Friedrich to resign on 7 August 1567. Friedrich traveled to the papal court in Rome to seek confirmation of his election, and was granted an extension of time until 25 November 1567. After great pressure was applied by the representative of Emperor Maximilian II, Friedrich finally resigned on 24 October 1567.

Friedrich spent his last years as a recluse in Cologne. He died on 23 December 1568.

Catholic Church titles
Preceded by Gebhard I von Mansfeld-Vorderort	Archbishop of Cologne; 1562–1567	Succeeded by Salentin IX of Isenburg-Grenzau
