= Laurentius Fabritius =

German Roman Catholic prelate

Most Reverend Laurentius Fabritius
- Auxiliary Bishop of Cologne; Titular Bishop of Cyrene
- Church: Catholic Church
- Archdiocese: Archdiocese of Cologne
- In office: 1588–1600
- Predecessor: Theobald Craschel
- Successor: Johann Nopel der Jüngere

Orders
- Consecration: 7 Aug 1588 by Ottavio Mirto Frangipani

Personal details
- Born: 1535 Uerdingen, Germany
- Died: 22 Jul 1600 (aged 64–65) Cologne, Germany

Laurentius Fabritius (1535 – 22 Jul 1600) was a Roman Catholic prelate who served as Auxiliary Bishop of Cologne (1588–1600) and Titular Bishop of Cyrene.

== Biography ==
Laurentius Fabritius was born in Uerdingen, Germany in 1535. On 23 Mar 1588, he was appointed during the papacy of Pope Sixtus V as Auxiliary Bishop of Cologne and Titular Bishop of Cyrene. On 7 Aug 1588, he was consecrated bishop by Ottavio Mirto Frangipani, Bishop of Caiazzo. He served as Auxiliary Bishop of Cologne until his death on 22 Jul 1600. While bishop, he was the principal consecrator of Dietrich von Furstenberg, Bishop of Paderborn (1589).

== External links and additional sources ==
- Cheney, David M. "Cyrene (Titular See)". Catholic-Hierarchy.org. (for Chronology of Bishops) ^{[self-published]}
- Chow, Gabriel. "Titular Episcopal See of Cyrene (Libya)". GCatholic.org. (for Chronology of Bishops) ^{[self-published]}
- Cheney, David M. "Archdiocese of Köln {Cologne}". Catholic-Hierarchy.org. (for Chronology of Bishops) ^{[self-published]}
- Chow, Gabriel. "Metropolitan Archdiocese of Köln (Germany)". GCatholic.org. (for Chronology of Bishops) ^{[self-published]}

Catholic Church titles
Preceded by Theobald Craschel	Titular Bishop of Cyrene; 1588–1560	Succeeded by Johann Nopel der Jüngere
