= Heinrich Unkel =

Auxiliary bishop in Cologne

Most Reverend Heinrich Unkel
- Auxiliary Bishop of Cologne; Titular Bishop of Cyrene
- Church: Catholic Church
- Archdiocese: Archdiocese of Cologne
- In office: 1481–1482

Personal details
- Died: 6 July 1556 Cologne, Germany

Heinrich Unkel, O.F.M. or Arnold von Unkel (died 22 Jan 1482) was a Roman Catholic prelate who served as Auxiliary Bishop of Cologne (1481–1482).

== Biography ==
Heinrich Unkel was appointed a priest in the Order of Friars Minor. In 1481, he was appointed during the papacy of Pope Sixtus IV as Auxiliary Bishop of Cologne and Titular Bishop of Cyrene. He died on 22 Jan 1482 before he was installed.

== External links and additional sources ==
- Cheney, David M. "Cyrene (Titular See)". Catholic-Hierarchy.org. (for Chronology of Bishops) ^{[self-published]}
- Chow, Gabriel. "Titular Episcopal See of Cyrene (Libya)". GCatholic.org. (for Chronology of Bishops) ^{[self-published]}
- Cheney, David M. "Archdiocese of Köln {Cologne}". Catholic-Hierarchy.org. (for Chronology of Bishops) ^{[self-published]}
- Chow, Gabriel. "Metropolitan Archdiocese of Köln (Germany)". GCatholic.org. (for Chronology of Bishops) ^{[self-published]}

Catholic Church titles
Preceded by Matthias Emich	Titular Bishop of Cyrene; 1481–1482	Succeeded by Johann Spenner
Preceded by	Auxiliary Bishop of Cologne; 1481–1482	Succeeded by
