= Cologne Diocesan Feud =

15th-century Western European conflict

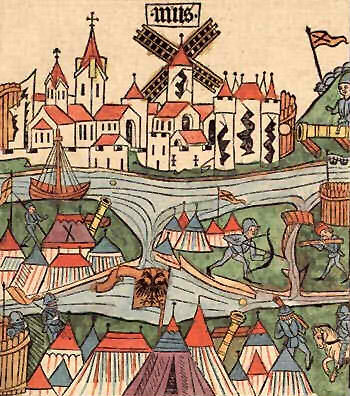
The siege of Neuss was an important event in the Cologne Diocesan Feud (illustration by Conradius Pfettisheim)

The Cologne Diocesan Feud (German: Kölner Stiftsfehde, or Stiftsfehde zu Köln), also called the Neuss War (Neusser Krieg) or Burgundian War (Burgundischer Krieg), was a conflict, which began in 1473, between the Archbishop of Cologne, Ruprecht of the Palatinate and the Landstande of his archbishopric. As a result of the involvement of Charles the Bold of Burgundy and, eventually, the Holy Roman Empire the matter at times assumed a European dimension. It finally ended when Ruprecht died in 1480.

== Background ==
After the death of Dietrich II of Moers, the estates in the secular dominion ("Archbishopric") of the Archbishop of Cologne banded together to form so-called "hereditary estate agreements" (Erblandesvereinigungen). The Erblandesvereinigung in the Diocese itself also joined the ecclesiastical territory of Vest Recklinghausen. In the Duchy of Westphalia the estates agreed their own Erblandesvereinigung. These agreements had henceforth to be sworn by new archbishops in their role as territorial rulers. The Erblandesvereinigung envisaged that, in this case of important fiscal and public policy issues, the sovereign had to seek the permission of estates or Landstände. Although Ruprecht came from the centre of the cathedral chapter, it was not long before he ignored the Erblandesvereinigung he had sworn. Instead he hired mercenaries from the Palatinate, with whom he intended to recapture the estates enfeoffed by previous archbishops. When he let a dispute occur over the raising of a poll and hearth tax on the town of Zons, which was enfeoffed to the cathedral chapter, the conflict broke out openly. He also tried to take the town of Neuss by force. The Landstände saw the actions of the Archbishop as an infraction of Erblandesvereinigung, relied on their right to opposition and deposed Ruprecht. In his place, in the spring of 1473, they elected Hermann of Hesse as the administrator (Stiftsverweser) of the Diocese. The estates had strong support from the cities of Cologne and Neuss.

== Course ==
Ruprecht did not accept this and was also supported by the small and middle-ranking estates. In 1473, Hessian troops under Johann Schenk zu Schweinsberg, sent to support the administrator, failed in their attempt to capture the town of Brilon in the Duchy of Westphalia, but then played an important role in the defence of Neuss. Ruprecht's situation improved as a result, because he was able to win the backing of Charles the Bold. The latter was even appointed as the "hereditary advocate" (Erbvogt) of the Diocese.

For his part, Charles the Bold saw a favourable opportunity to extend his power at the expense of the Diocese. The majority of the neighbouring territories were already in Burgundian hands. In addition, the Duchy of Cleves belonged to the allies. In 1473 after Charles the Bold also came into possession of the Duchy of Guelders, the existence of the Diocese became threatened. The same year there was an attempt at the "Trier Meeting" (Trierer Treffen) to clarify the position of Charles the Bold and the Emperor and the prince-electors. This attempt at negotiation proved unsuccessful. In April and May 1474, Ahrweiler was besieged by troops sympathetic to Ruprecht. The town walls and guns fended the attacks off.

Charles the Bold marched out with an army that was one of the largest and best equipped of its time. In his support was Frederick the Victorious of the Palatinate, brother of Archbishop Ruprecht, and the dukes of Guelders and Cleves. The allied troops jointly numbered about 13,000 to 20,000 men. Instead of marching on Cologne as Ruprecht had thought, the army advanced on Neuss, a town defended by Hermann of Hesse and his 4,000-man body of troops. Neuss was besieged in 1474/75 by the enemy forces (see the Siege of Neuss). The siege was ended by the delivery of an imperial ban by Emperor Frederick III. This ended the Neuss War, but not the diocesan feud.

After the withdrawal of Burgundian troops, Ruprecht of the Palatinate still had available several supporters in the Upper Diocese (Oberstift) and in the Duchy of Westphalia. So he did not give up. However, his position was severely weakened by the death of Frederick the Victorious in 1476 and Charles the Bold a year later. In the territory of the Diocese itself he was now only able to control Kempen and Altenahr whilst, outside, he still had several Westphalian estates. In 1478, he was taken prisoner by Hessian troops. However, initially the Hessians were unable to make gains in Westphalia. The Duke of Cleves, who fought on Ruprecht's side, was even able to occupy Arnsberg and Eversberg for a time.

After his capture, Ruprecht announced he was prepared to give up the office of archbishop. However, confirmation from the Pope in light of the difficult church legal situation - Ruprecht was not just the sovereign, but first and foremost a bishop - was taking a long time to arrive. Ruprecht's renunciation of the archbishop's office was also questionable, because he had come under external pressure. The death of Ruprecht on 26 July 1480 ended this tricky situation.

== See also ==
- Burgundian Wars, of which this was a part.
- Siege of Neuss.

== Literature ==
- Monika Storm: Das Herzogtum Westfalen, das Vest Recklinghausen und das rheinische Erzstift Köln: Kurköln in seinen Teilen. In: Harm Klueting (ed.): Das Herzogtum Westfalen. Vol.1: Das kölnische Herzogtum Westfalen von den Anfängen der kölner Herrschaft im südlichen Westfalen bis zur Säkularisation 1803. Münster, 2009, ISBN 978-3-402-12827-5 pp. 350–352
- Ferdinand Schmitz: Der Neusser Krieg 1474 - 1475. Sonderdruck aus den Rheinischen Geschichtsblättern. Bonn, 1896
