= Emich (surname) =

Emich is a surname of Germanic origin, see "Emich" for more. Notable people with this surname include:

- Friedrich Emich (1860–1940), Austrian chemist
- Kerstin Emich (born 1962), German judoka
- Matthias Emich (died 1480), Roman Catholic prelate
