= Adrian and Peter van Walenburch =

Dutch theologians

Adrian and Peter von Walenburch (born at Rotterdam (Adrian in 1609; Peter in 1610; Adrian died at Mainz, or Wiesbaden, 11 or 14 September 1669; Peter died at Cologne, 21 December 1675) were both auxiliary bishops of Cologne, and Dutch Roman Catholic controversial theologians.

== Lives ==
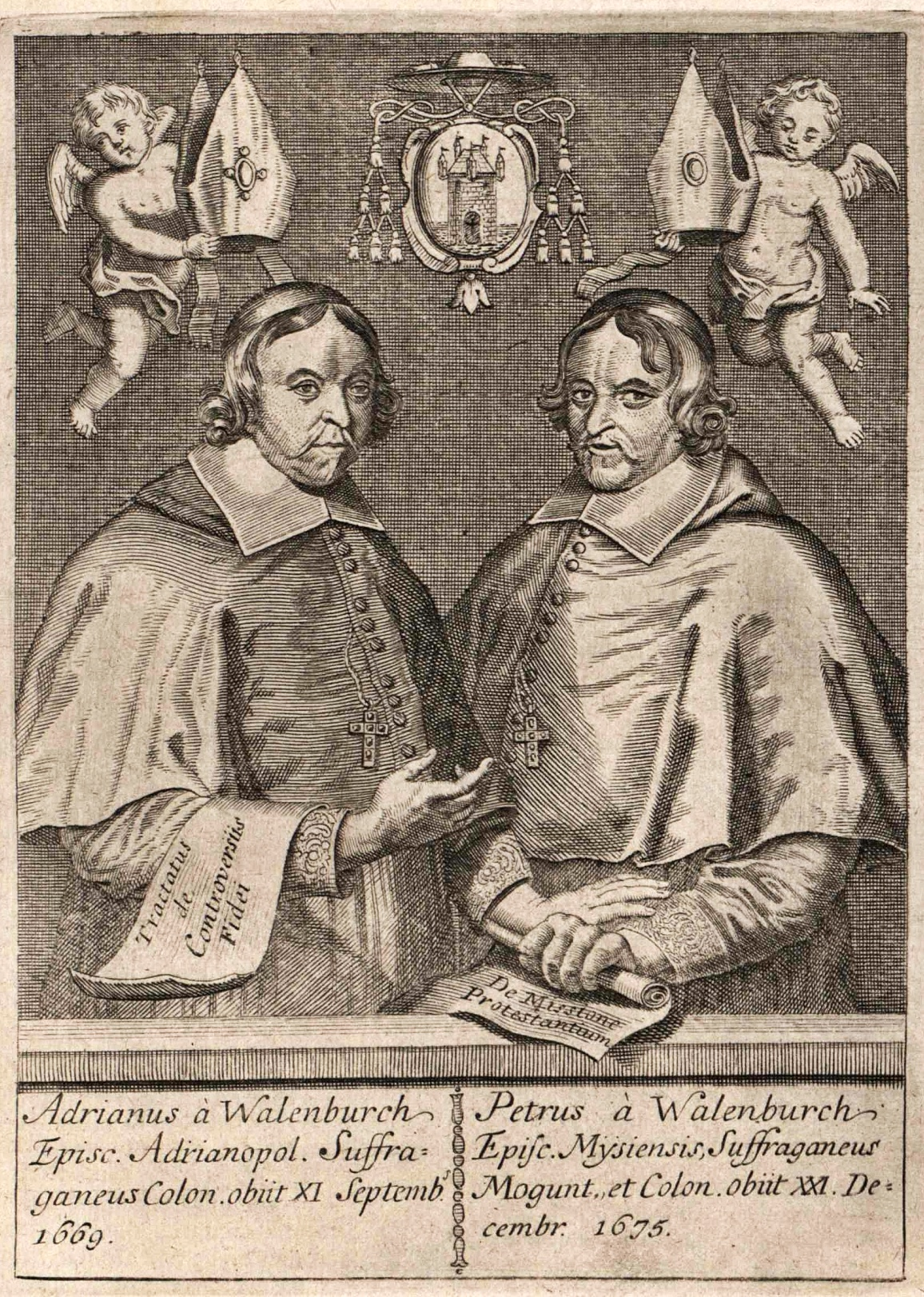
Brothers Walenburch

The early accounts of the brothers do not agree as to whether they were Protestants or Catholics in their youth. The brothers studied law in France and received the doctorate in civil and canon law. After returning to Rotterdam they studied Catholic theology. On account of the religious turmoil in the Netherlands, they went to Germany, living at the Court of the Duke of Pfalz-Neuburg at Düsseldorf till 1646, when they went to Cologne.

There in 1647 the Archbishop and Elector of Cologne, Maximilian Heinrich of Bavaria, appointed Adrian Auxiliary Bishop and Vicar-General of Cologne and consecrated him titular Bishop of Adrianople on 30 November 1661. The younger brother, Peter, became a canon of the collegiate Churches of St. Peter and St. Victor at Mainz; in 1658 he was made titular Bishop of Mysia and auxiliary bishop to the Archbishop and Elector Johann Philipp von Schönborn. The last years of his stay at Mainz coincide with the first years of Leibniz's residence at the Court of Mainz.

Peter aided Leibniz in his theological studies in connection with his scheme of ecclesiastical reunion. After Adrian's death Peter was appointed in 1669 Auxiliary Bishop of Cologne.

The most noted of the conversions effected by the brothers is that of the Landgrave Ernst of Hesse-Rheinfels, at Cologne in 1652.

== Works ==
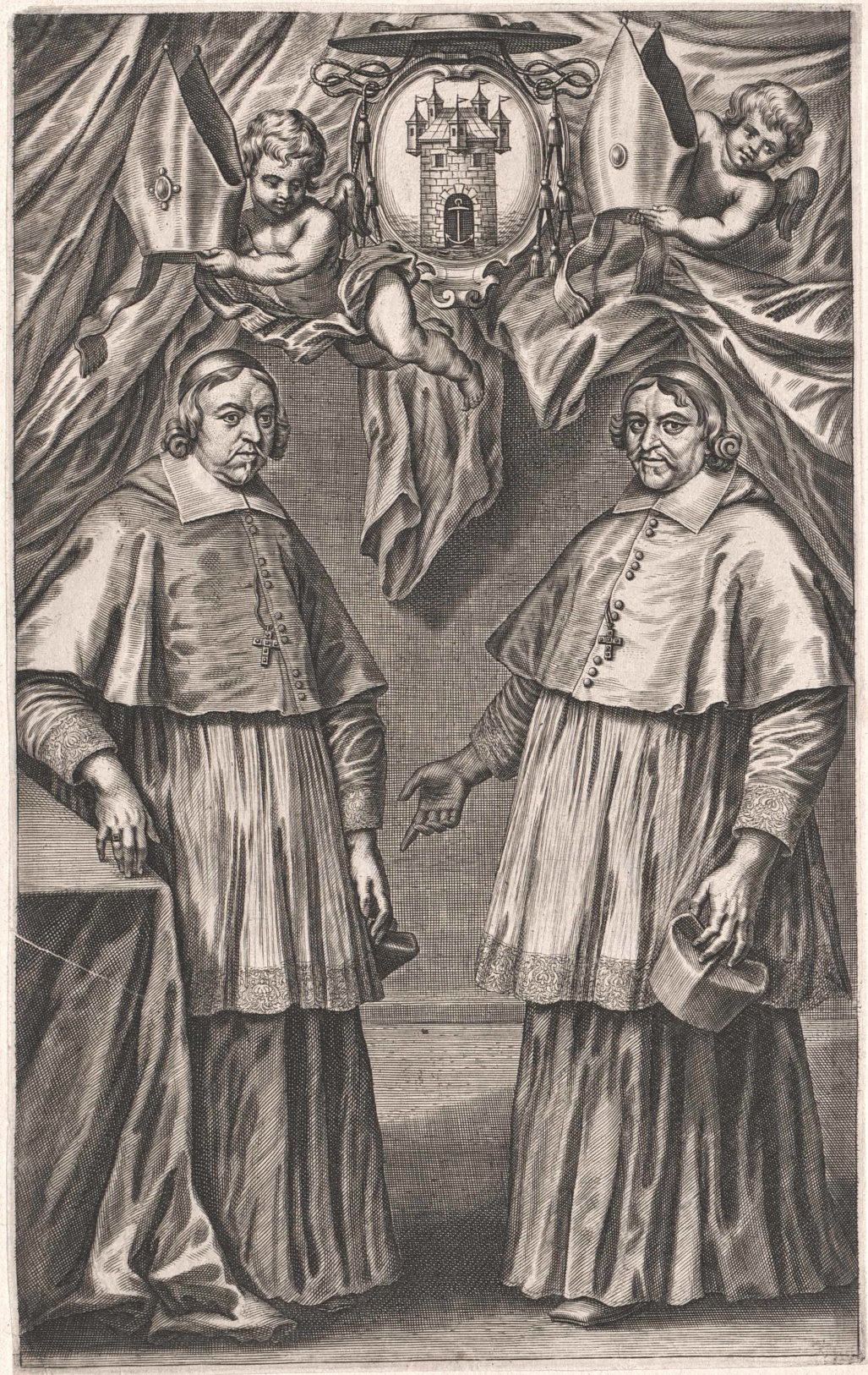
Brothers Walenburch

The brothers were noted for their theological learning; they were also voluminous writers in theological controversy with Protestants. Peter was the chief author of their joint works. They also engaged in literary controversy with many learned Protestant theologians: Coccejus, Ludwig Crocius, Johann Hülsemann, Johann Conrad Dannhauer, and Drelincourt. Their works are clear, thorough and moderate.

Their collected works were issued in two volumes folio (Cologne, 1669–71). The first volume contains mainly the exposition of principles, partly in treatises which lay the fundamental basis, partly in further discussions with Protestant opponents. The last treatise is a satire on Oliver Cromwell as the protector of Protestantism. The second volume "Tractatus speciales de controversiis fidei" (Cologne, 1671) contains seventeen treatises on special subjects.
