= Hildebold of Cologne =

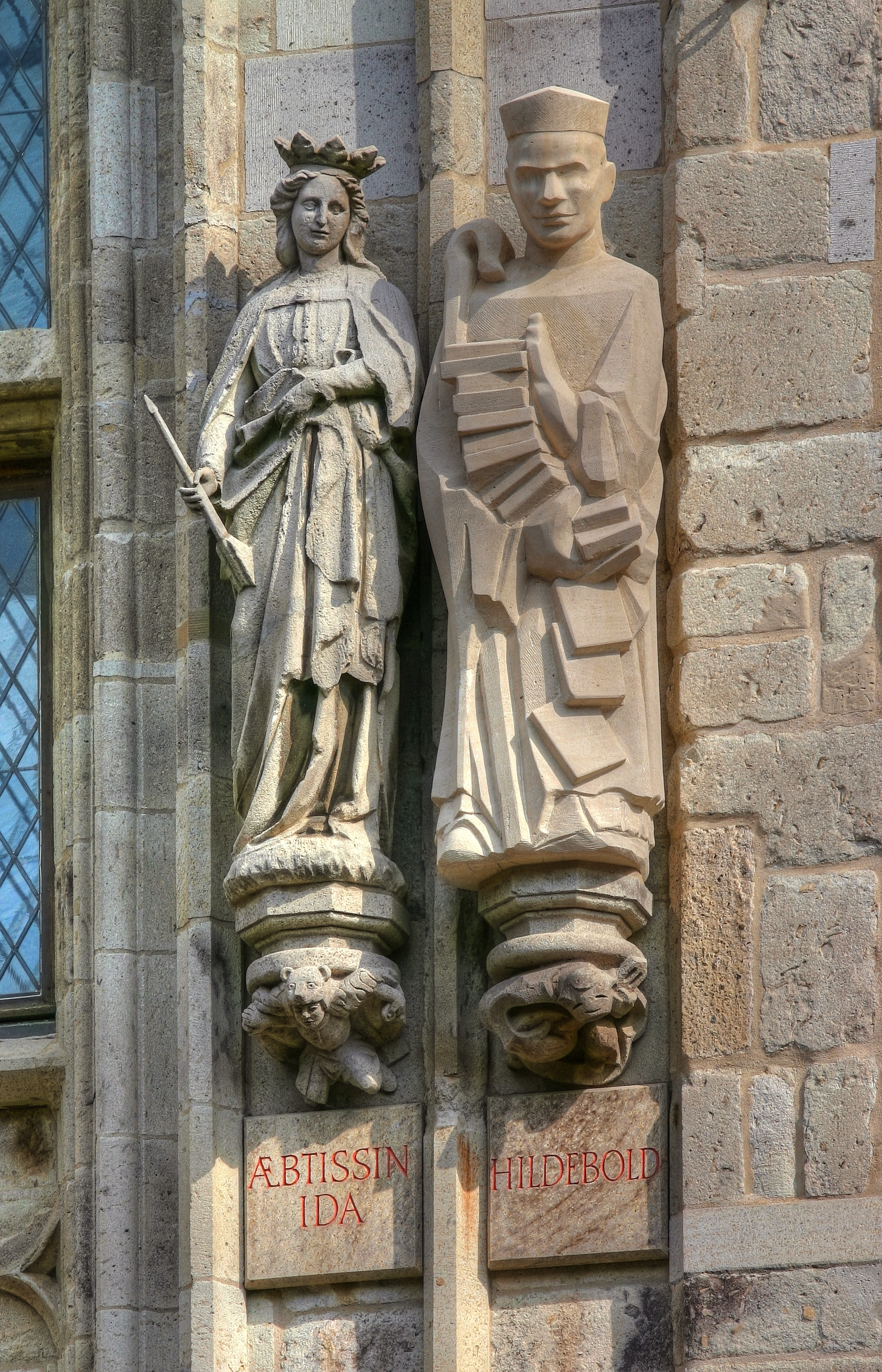
Stone sculptures of Ida and Hildebold at the Cologne City Hall Tower

Hildebold (died 3 September 818) was the Bishop of Cologne from 787 until 795 and the first Archbishop of Cologne thereafter.

A friend of Charlemagne, in 791 Hildebold was made the archchaplain and chancellor of the Imperial Council. At the request of Charlemagne, Pope Adrian I released Hildebold from the traditional episcopal requirement of residing in one's see. In 795, the pope raised Cologne to archiepiscopal status. The dioceses of Utrecht, Liège, Münster, Minden, Osnabrück, and Bremen were made suffragan. Hildebold began the construction of an extension of Cologne Cathedral that was only completed in 870, which in later times was called the Hildebold Cathedral.

In 805, he met the first bishop of Münster, St Ludgar.

Hildebold was the first witness to Charlemagne's testament of 811. Together with Richulf, he presided over the Synod of Mainz in 813 at St. Alban's Abbey, Mainz, and in the same year he prepared Louis the Pious to succeed his father. When Charlemagne died in 814, Hildebold donated to the construction of his tomb in Aachen. With Pope Stephen IV, he prepared the coronation of Louis in Reims.

Hildebold died on 3 September 818 and was buried in the Abbey of St Geron.

The friendship of Charlemagne and Hildebold has become something of a legend. It is said that they first met when Charlemagne was hunting in the forests outside Cologne. After a long day hunting and in need of a rest, Charlemagne stopped at a small chapel. After a while the chapel filled with worshippers and Hildebold gave his sermon. Charlemagne was so impressed by Hildebold's sermon that he offered a sum of gold to his chapel. Believing Charlemagne was only a hunter and not the king, Hildebold rejected the offer and asked only for a small piece of leather from the next deer killed so he could bind his old prayer book. Charlemagne was so impressed by this modesty that he immediately fostered a friendship with the cleric.

Preceded by Ricolf	Archbishop of Cologne (Bishop until 795); 784–818	Succeeded by Habdold
