= Jean Bourgeois =

16th century Auxiliary Bishop of Cologne

Most Reverend Jean Bourgeois
- Auxiliary Bishop of Cologne; Titular Bishop of Cyrene
- Church: Catholic Church
- Archdiocese: Archdiocese of Cologne
- In office: 1506–?

Jean Bourgeois de Montibus was a Roman Catholic prelate who served as Auxiliary Bishop of Cologne (1506–?).

== Biography ==
In 1506, Jean Bourgeois was appointed during the papacy of Pope Julius II as Auxiliary Bishop of Cologne and Titular Bishop of Cyrene. It is uncertain how long he served. While bishop, he was the principal co-consecrator of Érard de La Marck, Prince-bishop of the Prince-Bishopric of Liège (1506).

== External links and additional sources ==
- Cheney, David M. "Cyrene (Titular See)". Catholic-Hierarchy.org. (for Chronology of Bishops) ^{[self-published]}
- Chow, Gabriel. "Titular Episcopal See of Cyrene (Libya)". GCatholic.org. (for Chronology of Bishops) ^{[self-published]}
- Cheney, David M. "Archdiocese of Köln {Cologne}". Catholic-Hierarchy.org. (for Chronology of Bishops) ^{[self-published]}
- Chow, Gabriel. "Metropolitan Archdiocese of Köln (Germany)". GCatholic.org. (for Chronology of Bishops) ^{[self-published]}

Catholic Church titles
Preceded by Théodore Wichwael	Titular Bishop of Cyrene; 1506–?	Succeeded by Geremia Contugi
Preceded by	Auxiliary Bishop of Cologne; 1506–?	Succeeded by
