= Johann Pennarius =

Roman Catholic prelate (died 1563)

Most Reverend Johann Pennarius
- Auxiliary Bishop of Cologne; Titular Bishop of Cyrene
- Church: Catholic Church
- Archdiocese: Archdiocese of Cologne
- In office: 1557–1563

Personal details
- Died: 11 September 1563 Cologne, Germany

Johann Pennarius, O.F.M. (died 1563) was a Roman Catholic prelate who served as Auxiliary Bishop of Cologne (1557–1563).

== Biography ==
On 6 October 1557, Johann Pennarius was appointed during the papacy of Pope Paul IV as Auxiliary Bishop of Cologne and Titular Bishop of Cyrene. He served as Auxiliary Bishop of Cologne until his death on 11 September 1563.

== External links and additional sources ==
- Cheney, David M. "Cyrene (Titular See)". Catholic-Hierarchy.org. (for Chronology of Bishops) ^{[self-published]}
- Chow, Gabriel. "Titular Episcopal See of Cyrene (Libya)". GCatholic.org. (for Chronology of Bishops) ^{[self-published]}
- Cheney, David M. "Archdiocese of Köln {Cologne}". Catholic-Hierarchy.org. (for Chronology of Bishops) ^{[self-published]}
- Chow, Gabriel. "Metropolitan Archdiocese of Köln (Germany)". GCatholic.org. (for Chronology of Bishops) ^{[self-published]}
