= Eric of Brunswick-Grubenhagen =

Bishop of Paderborn and Osnabrück (1478–1532)

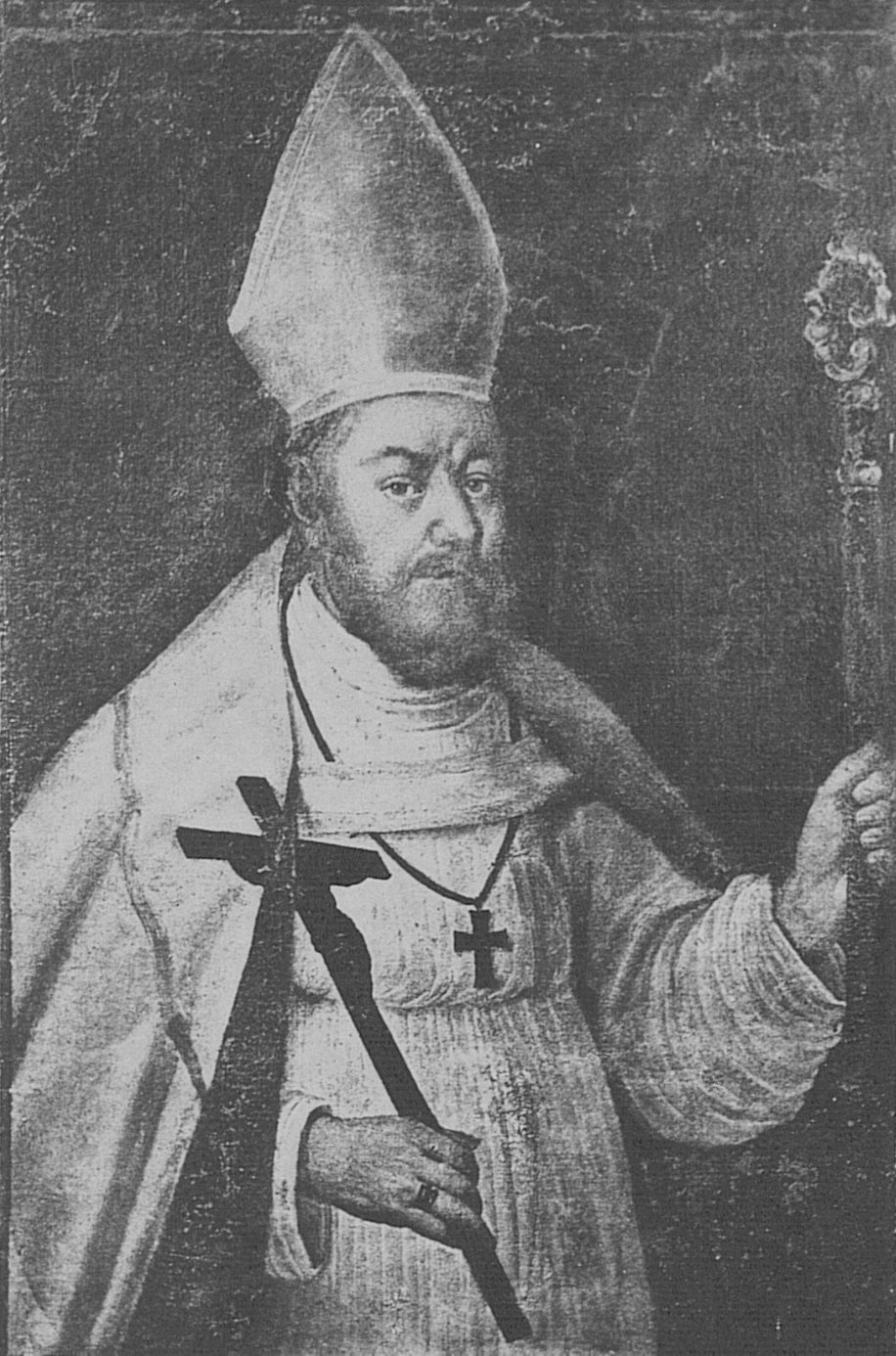
- Born: 1478
- Died: 14 May 1532; Fürstenau
- House: House of Guelph
- Father: Albert II, Duke of Brunswick-Grubenhagen
- Mother: Elizabeth of Waldeck

Eric of Brunswick-Grubenhagen (1478 – 14 May 1532 in Fürstenau) was from 1508 to 1532 prince-bishop of Paderborn and Osnabrück. In 1532, he was elected bishop of Münster, however, he died before he could be consecrated.

== Life ==
Eric was the youngest son of the Duke Albert II, Duke of Brunswick-Grubenhagen and his wife, Countess Elizabeth of Waldeck. While his elder brother Philip inherited the principality of Grubenhagen from his father, Eric was destined according to the customs of the era for a career in the clergy. After studying in Rome, he became canon at the cathedrals in Münster and Paderborn. Eric was elected prince-bishop of Paderborn and Osnabrück and his election was confirmed by Pope Julius II on 20 April 1509. However, Emperor Maximilian I refused to acknowledge him as prince and even outlawed him, because of an outstanding tax debt. Eric received imperial recognition only on 2 April 1521, from Emperor Charles V.

The Reformation started during his term in office. However, it hardly affected Eric, neither theologically, nor in his role as worldly ruler. He remained faithful to the Catholic doctrine himself, and did not have any disputes with his Lutheran neighbours, nor with the Lutheran citizens of the cities in his Prince-bishopric. He kept an open mind, and granted many exemptions to the Lutherans in his territory. In the Roman Catholic literature, his stance on religious matters is described as ambiguous, because he witnessed the wedding of a former Benedictine nun from Kaufungen.

In 1532, Frederick III of Wied resigned as Prince-Bishop of Münster and Eric III was elected as his successor. This would have meant that the three prince-bishoprics in Westphalia would be united in a personal union. However, Eric died unexpectedly on 14 May 1532, during a banquet in Fürstenau to celebrate his election in Münster with his noble friends.

Eric of Brunswick-Grubenhagen House of Welf Cadet branch of the House of Este Born: 1478 Died: 14 May 1532
Regnal titles
Catholic Church titles
Preceded by Herman I	Prince-Bishop of Paderborn as Eric; 1508–1532	Succeeded by Hermann II
Preceded by Conrad IV	Prince-Bishop of Osnabrück as Eric II; 1508–1532	Succeeded by Francis I of Waldeck
Preceded by Frederick III of Wied	Prince-Bishop of Münster as Eric III; 1532	Succeeded by Francis I of Waldeck
