= Georgius Pauli-Stravius =

Belgian Roman Catholic prelate

Most Reverend Georgius Pauli-Stravius
- Auxiliary Bishop of Cologne; Titular Bishop of Ioppe
- Church: Catholic Church
- Archdiocese: Archdiocese of Cologne
- In office: 1640–1661

Orders
- Ordination: 25 March 1627
- Consecration: 17 February 1641 by Franz Wilhelm von Wartenberg

Personal details
- Born: 1593 Lozzen Cuttecoven, Belgium
- Died: 7 February 1661 (age 68) Cologne, Germany

Georgius Pauli-Stravius or Georg Pauli-Stravius (1593–1640) was a Roman Catholic prelate who served as Auxiliary Bishop of Cologne (1640–1661) and Titular Bishop of Ioppe.

== Biography ==
Georgius Pauli-Stravius was born in Lozzen Cuttecoven, Belgium in 1593 and ordained a priest on 25 Mar 1627. On 26 Mar 1640, he was appointed during the papacy of Pope Urban VIII as Auxiliary Bishop of Cologne and Titular Bishop of Ioppe. On 17 Feb 1641, he was consecrated bishop by Franz Wilhelm von Wartenberg, Bishop of Osnabruck, with Wolther Heinrich von Strevesdorff, Titular Bishop of Ascalon, serving as co-consecrators. He served as Auxiliary Bishop of Cologne until his death on 7 Feb 1661.

== External links and additional sources ==
- Cheney, David M. "Archdiocese of Köln {Cologne}". Catholic-Hierarchy.org. (for Chronology of Bishops) ^{[self-published]}
- Chow, Gabriel. "Metropolitan Archdiocese of Köln (Germany)". GCatholic.org. (for Chronology of Bishops) ^{[self-published]}
