= Augustinerkirche, Mainz =

Coordinates: 49°59′49″N 8°16′29″E

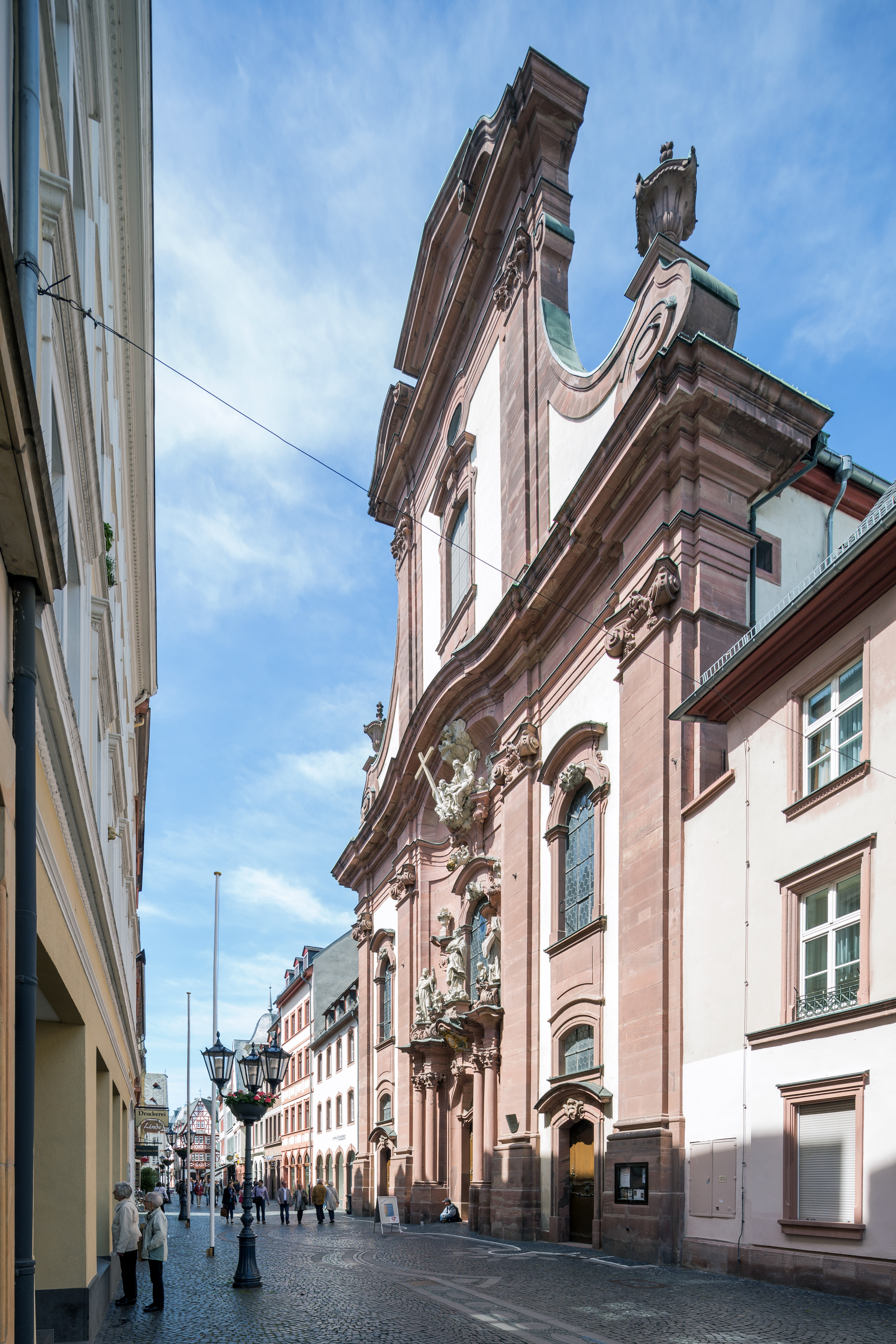
View of St. Augustin from street side Augustinerstraße, south-east, June 2013

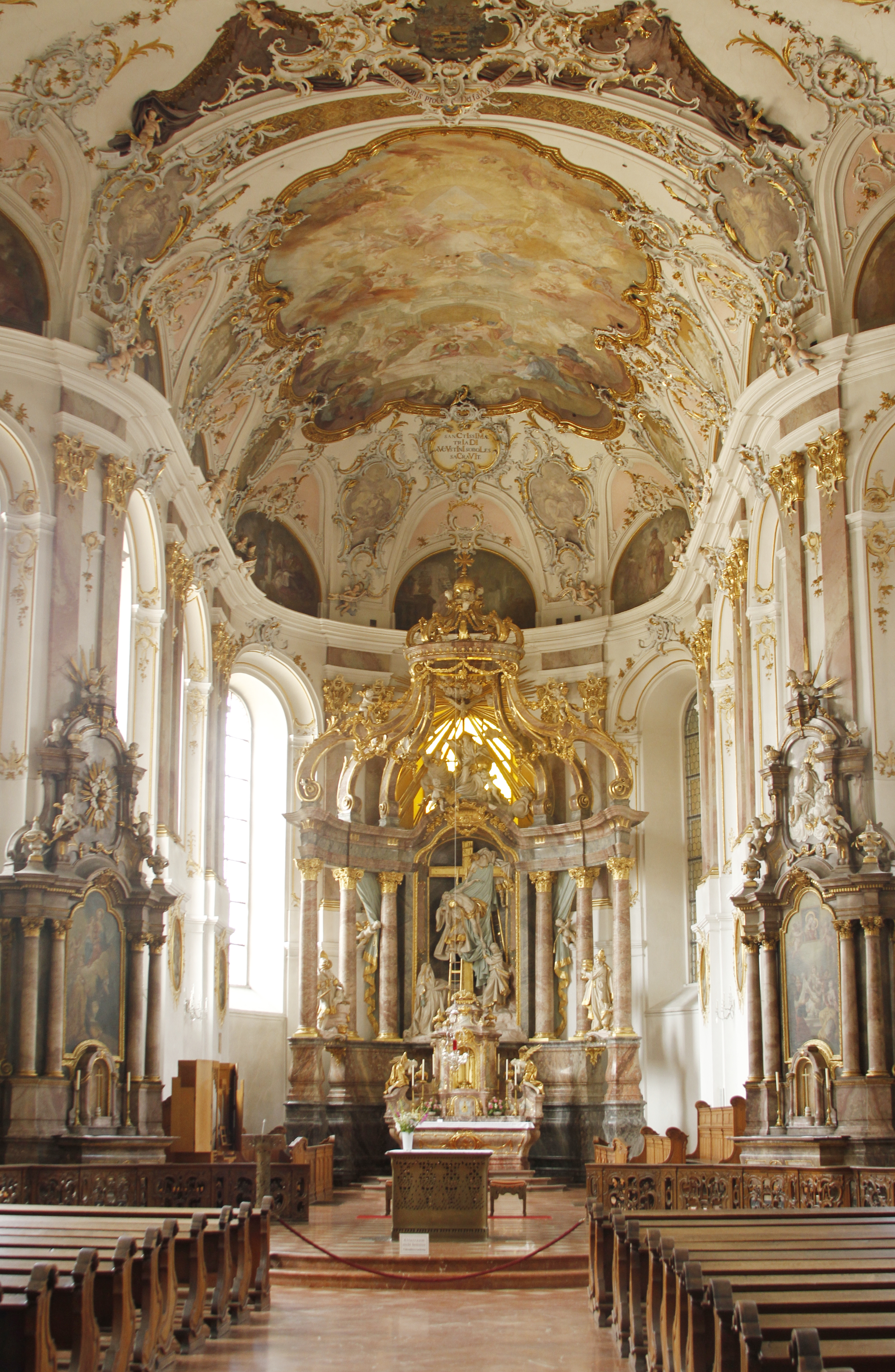
Internal of St. Augustin. View from west to east to the choir.

The church of St. Augustin known in German as Augustinerkirche, was the minster of the Augustine friars in the city centre of Mainz. Today it is the seminary church of the Catholic theological seminary of the Roman Catholic Diocese of Mainz.

== History ==
The church was built from 1768 to 1771 on the site of a Gothic church building on the Augustinian Street, dating to 1260. The builders were Augustinian hermits, who had already built the predecessor building and whose fraternity endured from 1260 to the Imperial Reichsdeputationshauptschluss of 1803. The name of the master mason is not known.

After the secularization of the monastery in 1803, the building ensemble became a seminary comprising a church of the diocese of the newly created bishopric in 1805. The church was not destroyed in World War II.

== Architecture ==
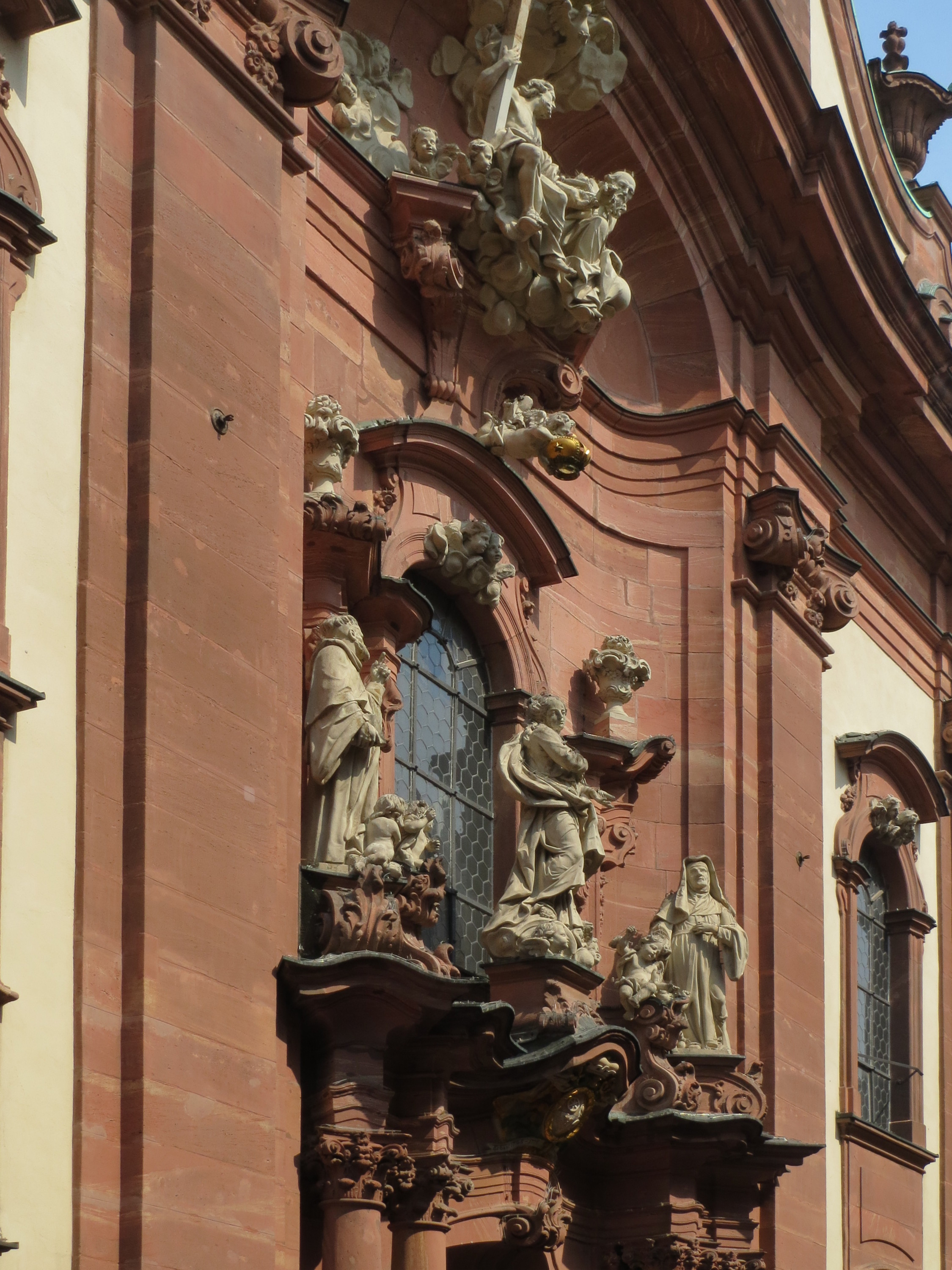
Figurengruppe über dem Portal. Marienkrönung durch die Allerheiligste Dreifaltigkeit, der auch die Kirche geweiht ist.

Despite its late origins, the exterior of the church is very much associated with the baroque style. Due to the surrounding property with the convent and seminar buildings and other houses, it is only possible to see the church with its mighty towerless façade that overlooks the other buildings of the old town. Above the portal rises a group of personalities created for the church by Nikolaus Binterim. It is essentially the coronation of Mary, Queen of Heaven, flanked by Augustine of Hippo, patron saint and ruler of the Augustinian order, and his mother Monica of Hippo. In the south and east of the church are the former convent buildings and rooms of the seminar, which were built between 1737 and 1753. The wing of the monastery complex has a beautiful portal with figures, which also come from Nikolas Binterim, after the façade of the church itself. The interior of the church tends to rococo, which is expressed by a fusion of nave and choir a concept that is increasingly found in the Rococo stylistic.

== Interior ==
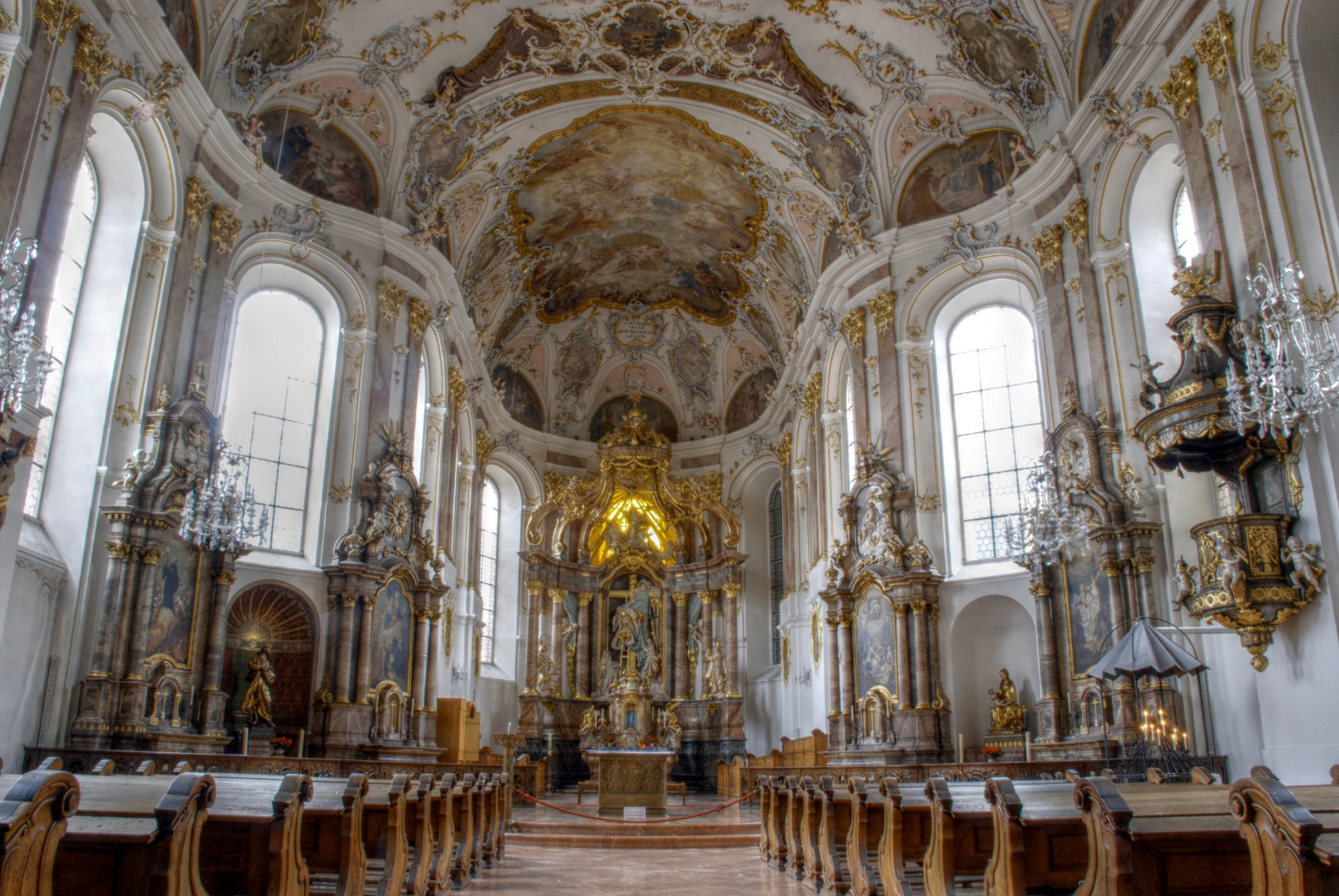
The rich decorated interior

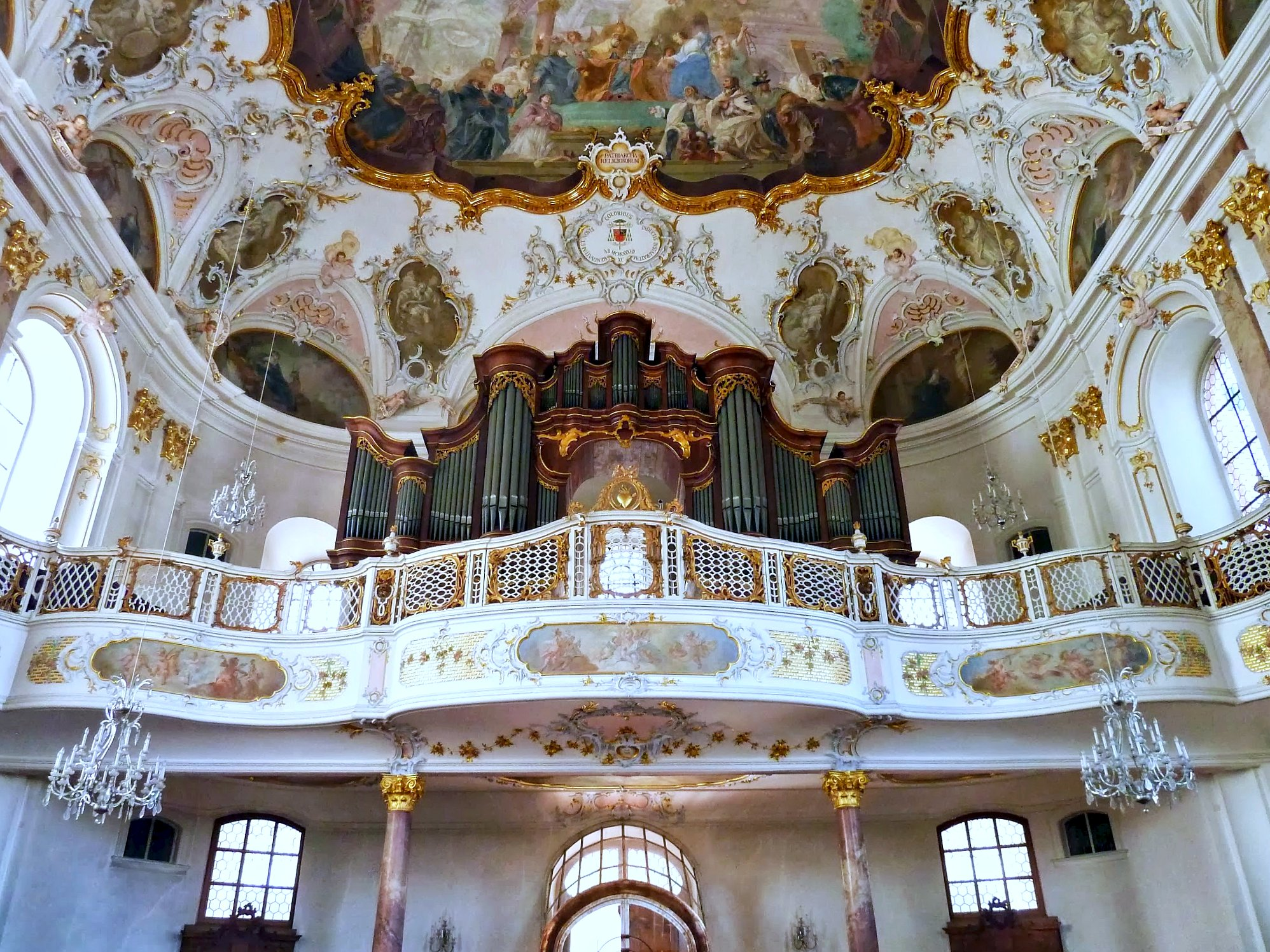
Die Orgel des Johann Philipp Stumm auf der Westempore der Augustinerkirche

The altars are according to the Rococo style, but the late construction of the church is illustrated here in that the echoes of Classicism can be found. The furnishing makes a very rich impression through the large altars and the ceiling paintings created by Johann Baptist Enderle in 1772.

In the church a Mary, mother of Jesus sculpture of 1420 is displayed, which was transferred to the Augustin church in 1807 from the demolished Gothic ″Liebfrauenkirche″ (St. Maria ad Gradus), located beneath Mainz Cathedral.

== Pipe organ ==
As one of the few examples of a Baroque pipe organ, one of the famous organ manufacturer family Stumm is placed in the Augustinian church; since 1773, the organ has been preserved to a large extent in the original form. The instrument has 31 stops on two manuals and pedal. The key and stop tracker actions are mechanical.

I Main division C–d^{3}
Bourdon	16′
Principal	8′
Großgedackt	8′
Quintatön	8′
Viol da Gamba	8′
Gemshorn	8′
Octav	4′
Flaut	4′
Quint	3′
Superoctav	2′
Cornett V
Mixtur IV	2′
Combal II	1′
Trompet (B/D)	8′

II Kronwerk C–d^{3}
Hohlpfeife	8′
Flaut travers	8′
Principal	4′
Floet	4′
Quint	3′
Octav	2′
Tertia	1 3/5′
Mixtur III	1′
Krummhorn	8′
Vox humana	8′
Tremulant

(Repetitions)Pedal C–d^{1}
Subbass	16′
Violonbass	16′
Principal	8′
Octavbass	8′
Quintbass	4′
Octavbass	4′
Mixturbass VI	2′

- Couplers: manual shift coupler, pedal coupler
