= Gebhard I von Mansfeld-Vorderort =

Johann Gebhard von Mansfeld-Vorderort
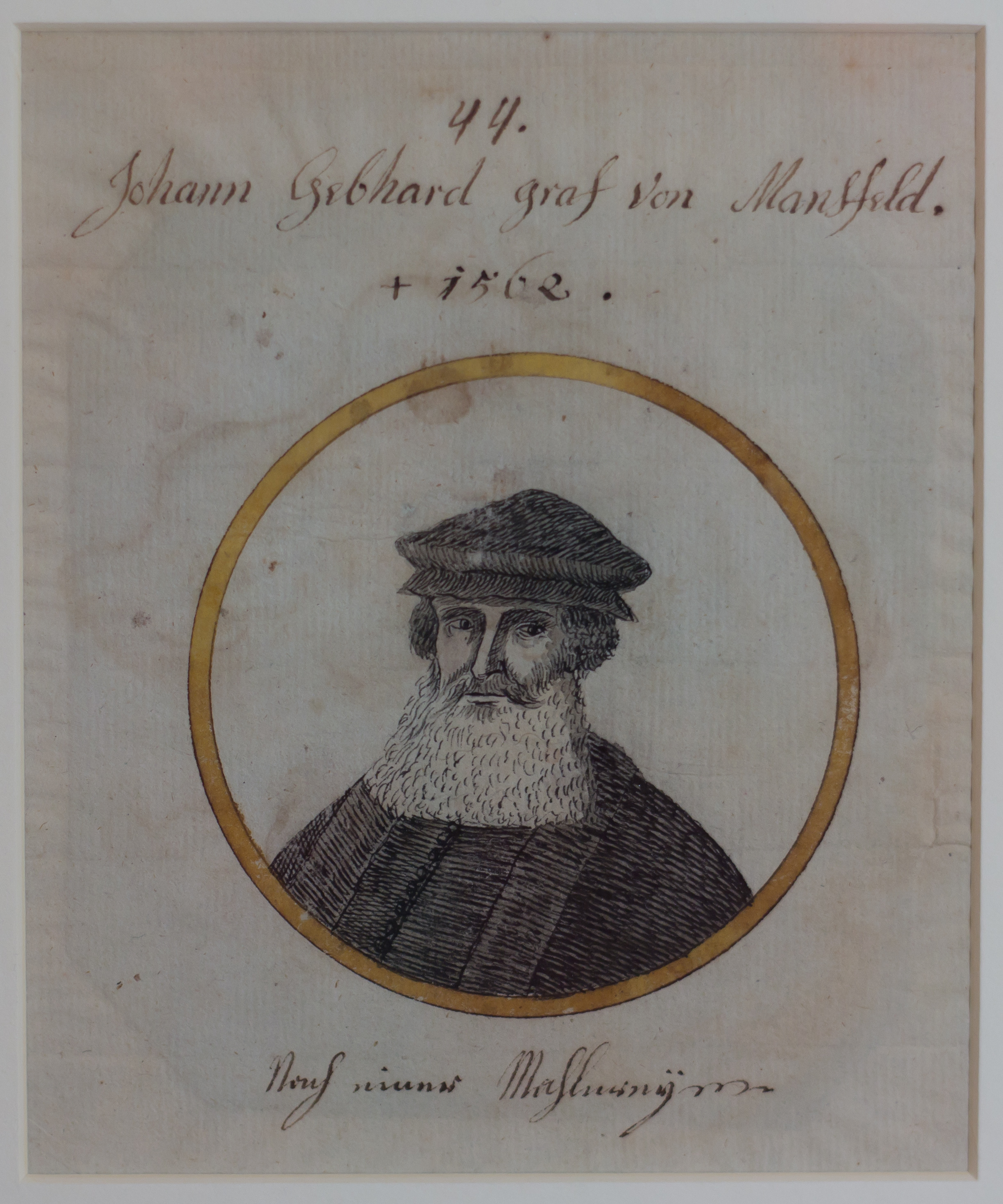
- Born: c. 1525–1530
- Died: 2 November 1562; Frankfurt am Main
- Children: Sybilla
- Parent: Ernst II Count von Mansfeld zu Vorderort (6 December 1479 – 9 May 1531, in Heldrungen) (2) Dorothea zu Solm-Lich (25 January 1493 – 8 June 1578, Mansfeld)
- Church: Roman Catholic
- Title: Prince-elector, Archbishop of Cologne

Johann Gebhard von Mansfeld-Vorderort, born circa 1525–1530, was Archbishop-Elector of Cologne. He died in Frankfurt on 2 November 1562.

== Career ==
Both Gebhard and his older brother were founding members of the Schmalkaldic League. A dispute between Gebhard and his brother, Johann Albert, Graf von Mansfeld zu Arnstein (1522–1586) in 1546, led to mediation by Martin Luther.

In 1558, Gebhard of Mansfeld was elected archbishop of Cologne. During his tenure, the Diocese of Utrecht ceased to be a suffragan of Cologne, and the Deanery of Zyfflich was incorporated with the newly founded diocese of Roermond.

== Family ==
As Domherr (canon), a member of the cathedral chapter, he lived in concubinage. He had at least one surviving child, a daughter Sybilla, who married, first, Eduard (Egbert) von Bocholtz (died after 1590); and second, Johann Eggenoy (died before 1616).

Gebhard of Mansfeld-Vorderort House of Mansfeld Born: between 1525 and 1530 Died: 2 November 1562 in Frankfurt upon Main
Regnal titles
Catholic Church titles
Preceded by Anton of Schauenburg	Archbishop-Elector of Cologne and Duke of Westphalia and Angria as Gebhard I 1558–1562	Succeeded by Friedrich IV of Wied
