= Arnald de Arceto =

Roman Catholic prelate

Most Reverend Arnald de Arceto
- Auxiliary Bishop of Cologne; Titular Bishop of Ceraunia
- Church: Catholic Church
- Archdiocese: Archdiocese of Cologne
- In office: 1517–?

Arnald de Arceto, O.E.S.A. was a Roman Catholic prelate who served as Auxiliary Bishop of Cologne (1517–?) and Titular Bishop of Ceraunia (1517–?).

== Biography ==
Arnald de Arceto was ordained a priest in the Order of Saint Augustine. On 20 Apr 1517, he was appointed during the papacy of Pope Leo X as Auxiliary Bishop of Cologne and Titular Bishop of Ceraunia. It is uncertain how long he served; the next Titular Bishop of Ceraunia and auxiliary bishop of record in Cologne was Nicolas Melchiori who was appointed in April 1518.

== External links and additional sources ==
- Cheney, David M. "Archdiocese of Köln {Cologne}". Catholic-Hierarchy.org. (for Chronology of Bishops) ^{[self-published]}
- Chow, Gabriel. "Metropolitan Archdiocese of Köln (Germany)". GCatholic.org. (for Chronology of Bishops) ^{[self-published]}

Catholic Church titles
Preceded by	Titular Bishop of Ceraunia; 1517–?	Succeeded by Nicolas Melchiori
Preceded by	Auxiliary Bishop of Cologne; 1517–?	Succeeded by
