= Philip II of Daun-Oberstein =

Archbishop-Elector of Cologne

- Archbishop of Cologne
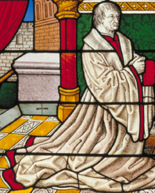
- Church: Roman Catholic Church
- Archdiocese: Cologne
- Appointed: 1508
- Term ended: 1515
- Predecessor: Hermann IV of Hesse
- Successor: Hermann of Wied

Orders
- Consecration: 14 November 1509 by Érard de La Marck

Personal details
- Born: 1463
- Died: 12 February 1515 (aged 51–52) Bonn, Electorate of Cologne
- Buried: Cologne Cathedral

Philip II of Daun-Oberstein (German: Philipp II von Daun-Oberstein) (1463 – 12 February 1515) was the Archbishop-Elector of Cologne from 1508 until 1515.

== Early life ==
Philip II of Daun-Oberstein was the fourth son of Graf Wirich IV of Daun-Oberstein and his wife Margaretha of Leiningen. As a younger son, he was groomed for a career in the church from an early age. He became a canon of Cologne Cathedral, and then became Domscholaster of the cathedral chapter in 1488, and then dean of Cologne Cathedral in 1489. He was also made a canon of Trier Cathedral.

== Archbishop of Cologne ==
On 13 November 1508 the cathedral chapter of Cologne Cathedral elected Philip II to be the new Archbishop-Elector of Cologne after the main rival candidate, Eric of Saxe-Lauenburg (later Prince-bishop of the Prince-Bishopric of Münster), withdrew. He received papal confirmation on 31 January 1509 and was consecrated as a bishop by Érard de La Marck, Prince-bishop of the Prince-Bishopric of Liège, on 14 November 1509. He continued the policies of his predecessor Hermann IV of Hesse, and inherited from him the controversy surrounding the independence of the city of Cologne. Philip's provincial synods are well-known.

Philip died in Bonn in 1515, and was buried next to Herman IV of Hesse in Cologne Cathedral.

Catholic Church titles
Preceded by Hermann IV of Hesse	Archbishop-Elector of Cologne; 1508–1515	Succeeded by Hermann of Wied
