= Johann Nopel der Ältere =

German Roman Catholic prelate

Most Reverend Johann Nopel der Ältere
- Auxiliary Bishop of Cologne; Titular Bishop of Cyrene
- Church: Catholic Church
- Archdiocese: Archdiocese of Cologne
- In office: 1539–1556

Personal details
- Died: 6 July 1556 Cologne, Germany

Johann Nopel der Ältere (died 6 July 1556) was a Roman Catholic prelate who served as Auxiliary Bishop of Cologne (1539–1556).

== Biography ==
On 29 October 1539, Johann Nopel der Ältere was appointed during the papacy of Pope Paul III as Auxiliary Bishop of Cologne and Titular Bishop of Cyrene. He served as Auxiliary Bishop of Cologne until his death on 6 July 1556. While bishop, he was the principal consecrator of Rembert von Kerssenbrock, Bishop of Paderborn (1548).

== See also ==
- Catholic Church in Germany

== External links and additional sources ==
- Cheney, David M. "Cyrene (Titular See)". Catholic-Hierarchy.org. (for Chronology of Bishops) ^{[self-published]}
- Chow, Gabriel. "Titular Episcopal See of Cyrene (Libya)". GCatholic.org. (for Chronology of Bishops) ^{[self-published]}
- Cheney, David M. "Archdiocese of Köln {Cologne}". Catholic-Hierarchy.org. (for Chronology of Bishops) ^{[self-published]}
- Chow, Gabriel. "Metropolitan Archdiocese of Köln (Germany)". GCatholic.org. (for Chronology of Bishops) ^{[self-published]}
