= Paul Aussem =

German Roman Catholic prelate

Most Reverend Paul Aussem
- Auxiliary Bishop of Köln; Titular Bishop of Halmiros
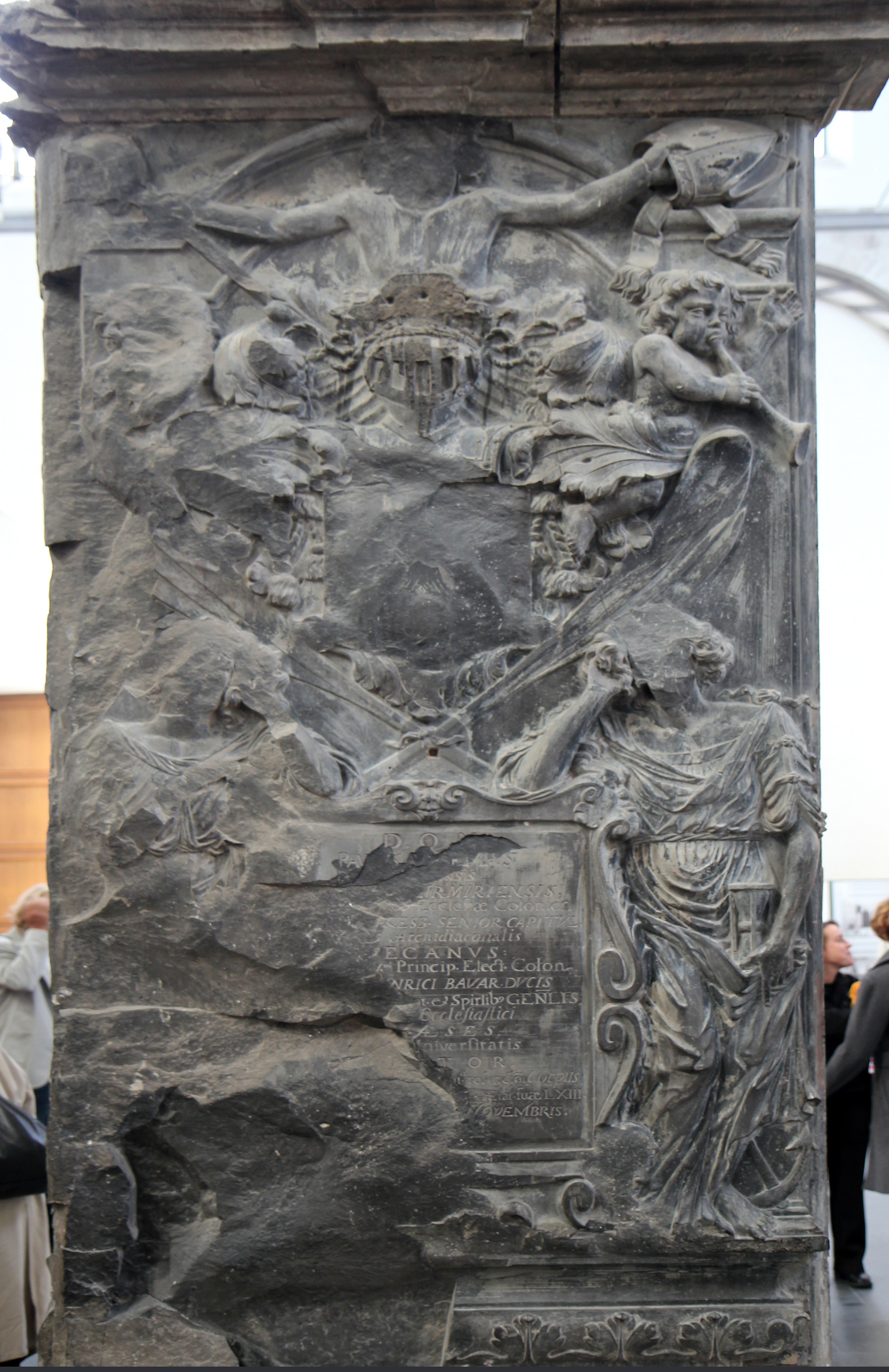
- Epitaph of Paul von Aussem in the Kirche St. Kunibert, Köln
- Church: Catholic Church
- Archdiocese: Archdiocese of Cologne
- In office: 1676–1679

Orders
- Consecration: 10 Jan 1677 by Opizio Pallavicini

Personal details
- Born: 1616 Cologne, Germany
- Died: 24 Nov 1679 (age 63) Cologne, Germany

Paul Aussem (died 1679) was a Roman Catholic prelate who served as Auxiliary Bishop of Köln (1676–1679) and Titular Bishop of Halmiros (1676–1679).

== Biography ==
Paul Aussem was born in Cologne, Germany in 1616. On 19 Oct 1676, he was appointed during the papacy of Pope Innocent XI as Auxiliary Bishop of Köln and Titular Bishop of Halmiros. On 10 Jan 1677, he was consecrated bishop by Opizio Pallavicini, Titular Archbishop of Ephesus. He served as Auxiliary Bishop of Köln until his death on 24 Nov 1679.

== External links and additional sources ==
- Cheney, David M. "Thebae Phthiotides (Titular See)". Catholic-Hierarchy.org. (for Chronology of Bishops) ^{[self-published]}
- Chow, Gabriel. "Titular Episcopal See of Thebæ Phthiotides". GCatholic.org. (for Chronology of Bishops) ^{[self-published]}
- Cheney, David M. "Archdiocese of Köln {Cologne}". Catholic-Hierarchy.org. (for Chronology of Bishops) ^{[self-published]}
- Chow, Gabriel. "Metropolitan Archdiocese of Köln (Germany)". GCatholic.org. (for Chronology of Bishops) ^{[self-published]}

Catholic Church titles
Preceded by Jan Chrzciciel Bużeński	Titular Bishop of Halmiros; 1676–1679	Succeeded by Serafino Brancone
Preceded by	Auxiliary Bishop of Köln; 1676–1679	Succeeded by
