= Ruprecht of the Palatinate (archbishop of Cologne) =

Archbishop and Elector of Cologne

- Archbishop of Cologne
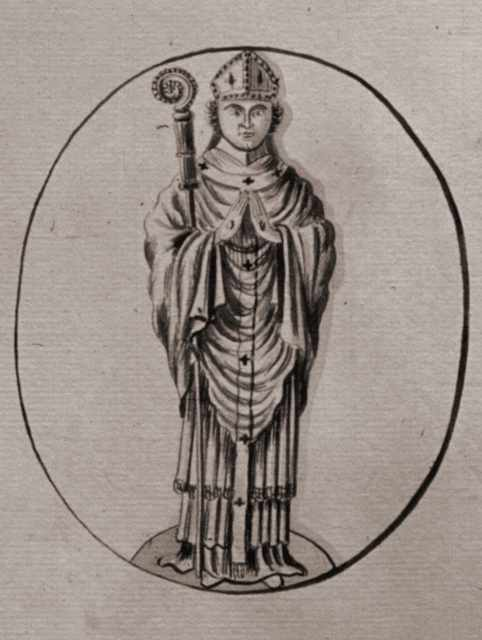
- Archbishop Ruprecht of the Palatinate, 1475
- Church: Roman Catholic Church
- Archdiocese: Cologne
- See: Cologne
- Appointed: 1463
- Term ended: 1480
- Predecessor: Dietrich II von Moers
- Successor: Hermann IV of Hesse

Orders
- Consecration: 1468

Personal details
- Born: 27 February 1427
- Died: 16 or 26 July 1480 (aged 53) Burg Blankenstein, Gladenbach, Landgraviate of Hesse

Ruprecht of the Palatinate (27 February 1427 – 16 or 26 July 1480) was the Archbishop and Prince Elector of Cologne from 1463 to 1480.

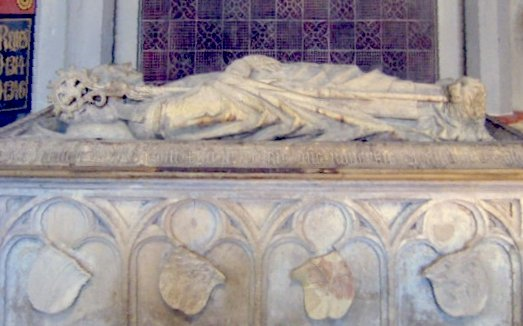
Ruprecht's grave in the Bonn Minster.

== Biography ==
Ruprecht was the third son of Louis III, Count Palatine of the Rhine, by his second wife, Matilda of Savoy. He renounced his claim to lands of the Palatinate and studied for holy orders at the universities of Heidelberg and Cologne. He was a canon in the Mainz Cathedral and then became subdeacon of the cathedral chapter at Cologne and cathedral provost at Würzburg.

Ruprecht was elected Archbishop of Cologne on 30 March 1463, but not confirmed by the Pope until August 1464 and not consecrated until Palm Sunday 1468. He only received the episcopal regalia from the Holy Roman Emperor in August 1471. Chosen for his family connections, he faced the challenge of guarding the Electorate of Cologne against diminution of its powers while solving its internal problems, in particular the shortage of income from being denied the toll income from the most important Rhine trading towns, which had been mortgaged by his predecessor, Dietrich II von Moers, to raise money for war. He was required to agree to 23 articles presented by the cathedral chapter limiting his financial options which the chapter and the Estates had agreed upon four days before his election, and to the chapter holding the important trading town of Zons as a pledge of his good behaviour.

Ruprecht quarrelled with his advisors and became involved in external politics. In 1467, he entered into an alliance with Adolf, Duke of Guelders against the Duke of Cleves, with the aim of regaining control over Soest, Xanten and Rees. After finally receiving his regalia, by autumn 1471 he was repudiating the agreement he himself had had a hand in drafting as a chapter member and demanding higher taxes, and to obtain them, he occupied Zons.

Ruprecht persisted in trying to reduce the privileges of cities within the archbishopric. With military and financial assistance from his brother Frederick I, Elector Palatine, he began the Cologne Ecclesiastical Conflict (German: Kölner Stiftsfehde), which grew into the Burgundian Wars. The majority of Ruprecht's vassals, including the citizens of Cologne, renounced their allegiance to him and asked both the Pope and Emperor Frederick III to intervene. In open rebellion, they proclaimed Landgrave Hermann of Hesse administrator and protector of the archbishopric. Only a few minor lords remained loyal to Ruprecht. Ruprecht appealed for help to Charles the Bold, Duke of Burgundy, who announced himself the protector of Cologne. The Emperor attempted in December 1473 to mediate the conflict, but failed. In 1474, Charles besieged Neuss, a stronghold of the rebels in which Hermann had taken refuge; the Reichstag decided at Augsburg to go to war against Charles, and a general call to arms was issued in the German Empire. The Siege of Neuss lasted almost a year and ended in Charles accepting the Pope's mediation, including concerning Ruprecht's position as archbishop. Ruprecht had been excommunicated by the Pope in 1472 for not paying required contributions from his see to Rome. His position continued to weaken; his brother did not support him against the Emperor and died on 12 December 1476, and he lost the support of all but Kempen and Altenahr and in March 1478 was taken captive by the Hessians. Imprisoned in Burg Blankenstein near Gladenbach and with the Duke of Jülich-Berg acting as mediator, he was forced to renounce his position as archbishop in exchange for an income of 4,000 gold guilders. He died before the Pope granted acceptance of his resignation, and was buried in the Bonn Minster. His successor as Archbishop of Cologne was Hermann of Hesse, who had successfully defended Neuss against him and his allies and became Hermann IV; he gave Ruprecht an imposing tomb.

Ruprecht had some success in monastic reform, extending even to institutions outside his area of control, in Cleves and Jülich-Berg. He was passionate about hunting and hawking.

== Sources ==
- Ellen Widder. "Karriere im Windschatten. Zur Biographie Erzbischof Ruprechts von Köln (1427–1478)". Vestigia Monasteriensia. Westfalen – Rheinland – Niederlande. Festschrift W. Janssen. Ed. Ellen Widder, Mark Mersiowsky and Peter Johanek. Studien zur Regionalgeschichte 5. Bielefeld: Verlag für Regionalgeschichte, 1995. ISBN 978-3-89534-110-6. pp. 29–72.

Catholic Church titles
Regnal titles
| Preceded by Dietrich II von Moers | Prince-Archbishop-Elector of Cologne; 1463–80 | Succeeded by Hermann IV of Hesse |
