= Hermann IV of Hesse =

Archbishop of Cologne (1442–1508)

- Archbishop of Cologne
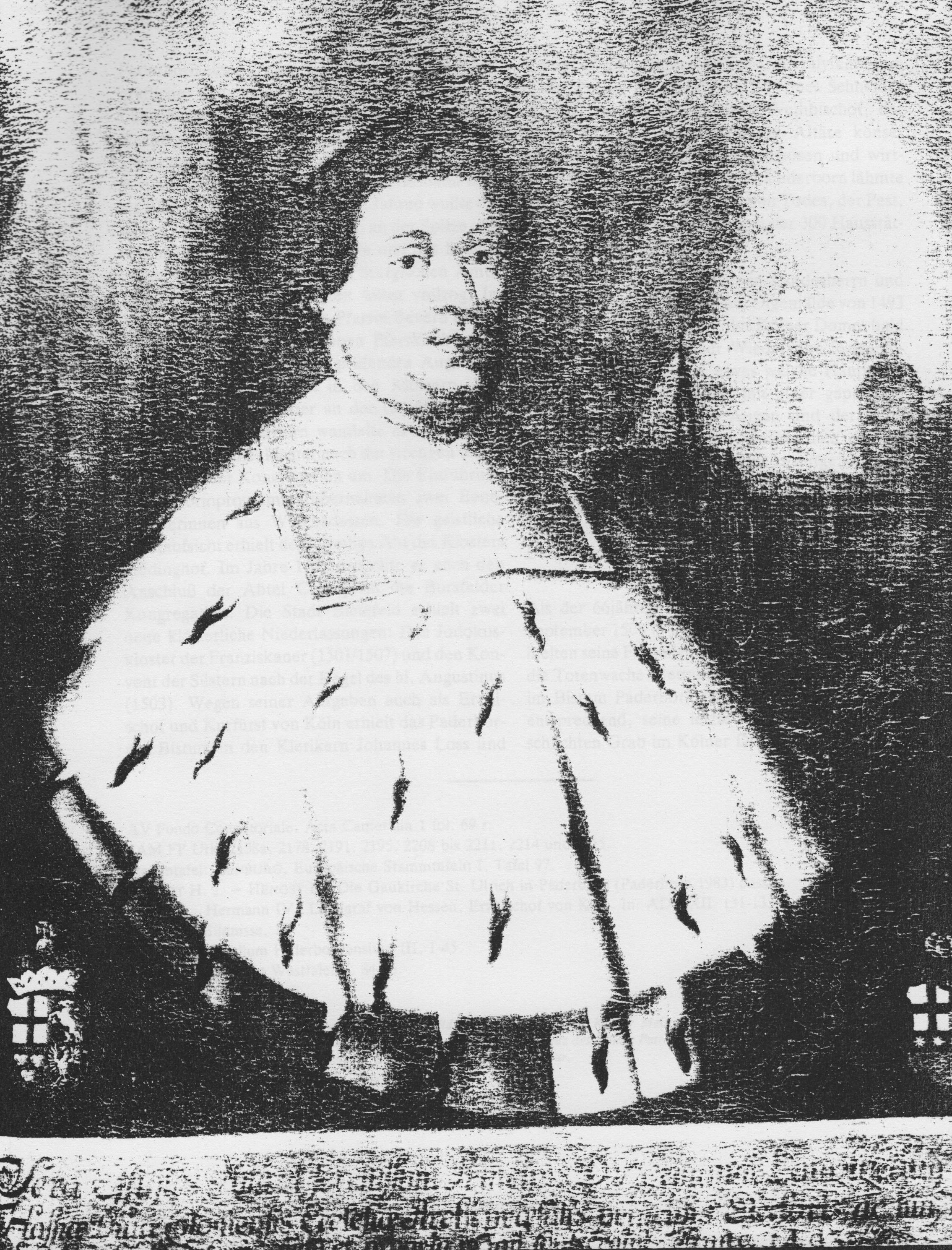
- Seventeenth-century recreation of a 1493 portrait of Hermann IV of Hesse.
- Church: Roman Catholic Church
- Archdiocese: Cologne
- Elected: 11 August 1480
- Term ended: 1508
- Predecessor: Ruprecht of the Palatinate
- Successor: Philip II of Daun-Oberstein

Orders
- Consecration: 4 March 1487

Personal details
- Born: 1442 Bonn, Electorate of Cologne
- Died: 27 September 1508 (aged 65–66)
- Buried: Cologne Cathedral

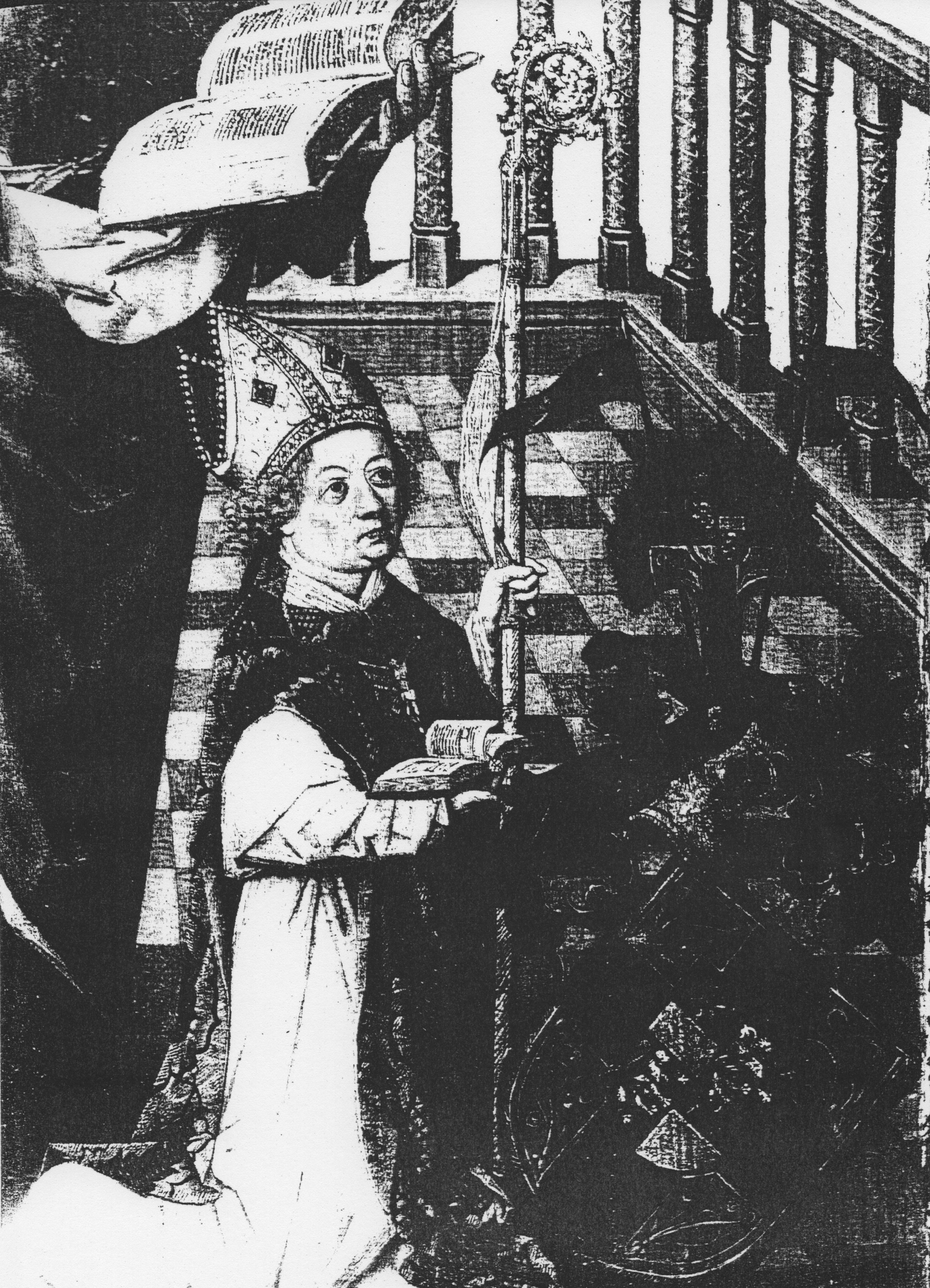
Hermann pictured on a panel by the Master of the Life of the Virgin.

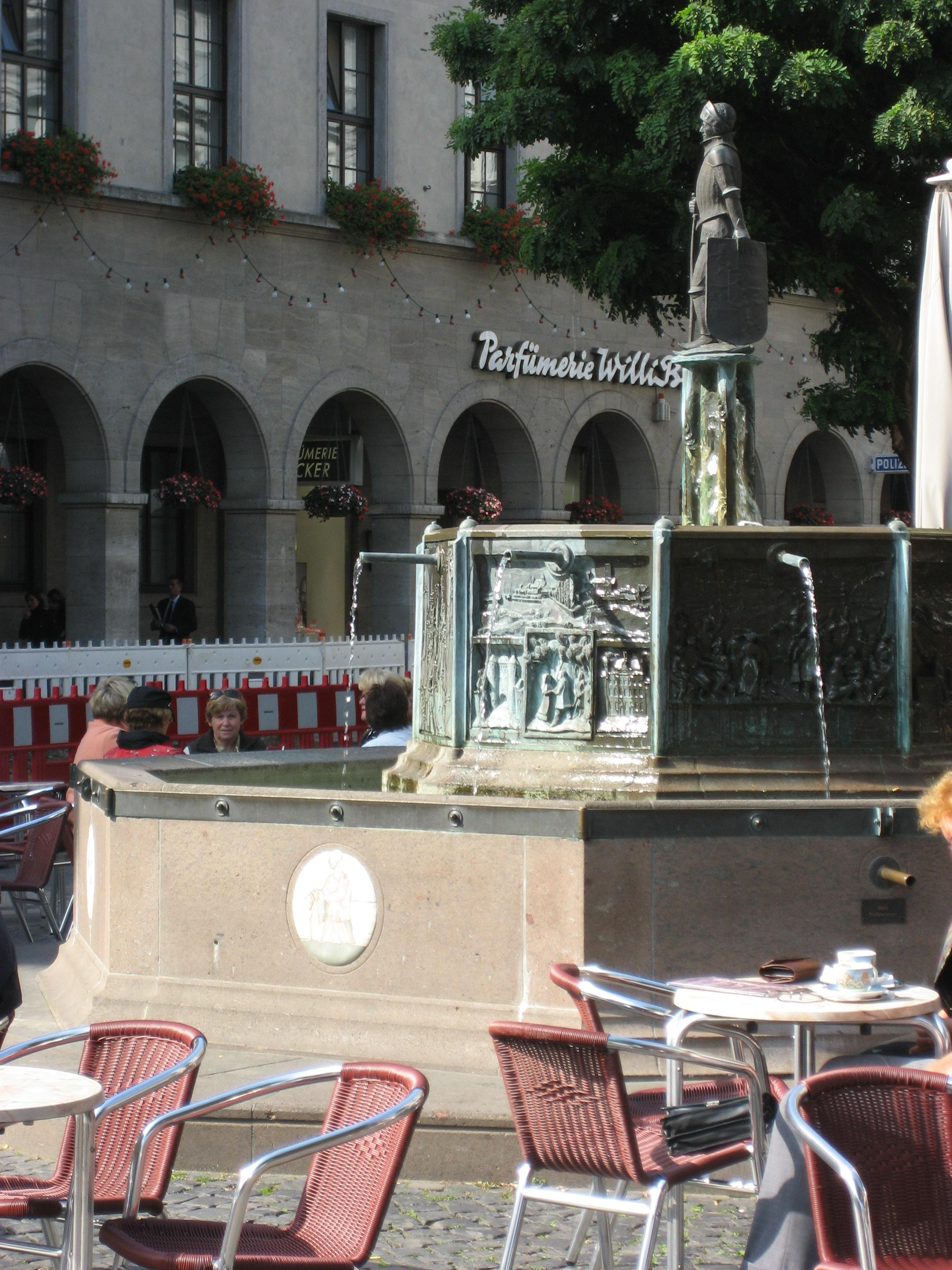
Statue of Hermann in Neuss.

Hermann IV of Hesse (German: Hermann von Hessen; "the Peaceful", German: der Friedsame, Latin: Pacificus) (1442 – 27 September 1508) was the Archbishop-Elector of Cologne from 1480 to 1508 and the Prince-Bishop of Paderborn from 1498 to 1508.

== Biography ==
=== Early years, 1450–1473 ===
Hermann IV of Hesse was born in Bonn in 1442, the son of Louis I, Landgrave of Hesse and his wife Anna, daughter of Frederick I, Elector of Saxony. As a younger son, Hermann was groomed for the church and received a number of benefices at a young age, including the provost of Aachen Cathedral and Fritzlar Cathedral; Dean of St. Gereon's Basilica; and canon of Cologne Cathedral (in 1461) and Mainz Cathedral (in 1463). He is listed on the register of University of Cologne for 1462 and later studied at the Charles University in Prague.

In 1472, Hermann made a bid to become Bishop of Hildesheim, but was forced to withdraw from the episcopal election after he failed to secure papal recognition. He became diocesan administrator of the Archdiocese of Cologne in 1473.

=== Role in the Siege of Neuss, 1474–1475 ===
As diocesan administrator of the Archdiocese of Cologne, Hermann was involved in the Cologne Ecclesiastical Conflict (German: Kölner Stiftsfehde) at the time that Charles the Bold launched the Siege of Neuss.

In November 1475, Frederick III, Holy Roman Emperor appointed Hermann Stiftsgubernator.

=== Archbishop of Cologne, 1480–1508 ===
Hermann assumed control of the administration of the Archdiocese of Cologne following the arrest of Archbishop Ruprecht of the Palatinate in 1478. After Ruprecht's death on 26 July 1480, Hermann was elected as his successor on 11 August 1480. Pope Innocent VIII confirmed his appointment in November 1480.

After many turbulent years, Hermann devoted himself to the administrative and financial recovery of the archdiocese. For the 28 years of peace and stability, Hermann earned himself the moniker of "the Peaceful".

==== Prince-Bishop of Paderborn, 1498–1508 ====
In 1495, Hermann became coadjutor bishop of the Prince-Bishopric of Paderborn. He was elected Prince-Bishop of Paderborn on 7 March 1498. He set himself against Philip of Cleves, Dean of Strasbourg Cathedral and his brother John II, Duke of Cleves but could not ultimately prevail. Hermann was allied with Maximilian I, Holy Roman Emperor and Pope Alexander VI.

The Reichskammergericht upheld Hermann's jurisdiction over the eastern part of Paderborn. He held a Lehenstag in Paderborn on 1 October 1500 to allow the nobles of Paderborn to pay homage to him. The Reichskammergericht also restored Helmarshausen and Delbrück to the bishop.

Hermann took his role as a spiritual pastor seriously and intensified episcopal oversight of the monasteries. He read mass and prayed the breviary regularly, and performed other episcopal liturgical acts. He arranged for the financing to build the church in Bevern in 1501, and consecrated the church in 1506.

=== Death ===
Hermann died on 27 September 1508. He was buried in Cologne Cathedral and his heart was buried in the castle church in Brühl, North Rhine-Westphalia.

== Ancestors ==
Ancestors of Hermann IV of Hesse

8. Louis the Junker
4. Hermann II, Landgrave of Hesse
9. Elizabeth of Sponheim
2. Louis I, Landgrave of Hesse
10. Frederick V, Burgrave of Nuremberg
5. Margaret of Hohenzollern-Nuremberg
11. Elisabeth of Meissen
1. Hermann IV of Hesse
12. Frederick III, Landgrave of Thuringia
6. Frederick I, Elector of Saxony
13. Catherine of Henneberg
3. Anna of Saxony, Landgravine of Hesse
14. Henry the Mild, Duke of Brunswick-Lüneburg
7. Catherine of Brunswick-Lüneburg
15. Sophie of Pomerania

Catholic Church titles
Preceded by Ruprecht of the Palatinate	Archbishop-Elector of Cologne; 1480–1508	Succeeded by Philip II of Daun-Oberstein
Preceded by Simon III of Lippe	Prince-Bishop of Paderborn; 1498–1508	Succeeded by Eric of Brunswick-Grubenhagen
