= Quirin op dem Veld von Willich =

German Roman Catholic prelate

Most Reverend Quirin op dem Veld von Willich
- Auxiliary Bishop of Cologne; Titular Bishop of Cyrene
- Church: Catholic Church
- Archdiocese: Archdiocese of Cologne
- In office: 1521–1537

Personal details
- Died: 9 November 1537 Cologne, Germany

Quirin op dem Veld von Willich (died 1537) was a Roman Catholic prelate who served as Auxiliary Bishop of Cologne (1521–1537).

== Biography ==
On 25 Oct 1521, Quirin op dem Veld von Willich was appointed during the papacy of Pope Leo X as Auxiliary Bishop of Cologne and Titular Bishop of Cyrene. He served as Auxiliary Bishop of Cologne until his death on 9 Nov 1537.

== See also ==
- Catholic Church in Germany

== External links and additional sources ==
- Cheney, David M. "Cyrene (Titular See)". Catholic-Hierarchy.org. (for Chronology of Bishops) ^{[self-published]}
- Chow, Gabriel. "Titular Episcopal See of Cyrene (Libya)". GCatholic.org. (for Chronology of Bishops) ^{[self-published]}
- Cheney, David M. "Archdiocese of Köln {Cologne}". Catholic-Hierarchy.org. (for Chronology of Bishops) ^{[self-published]}
- Chow, Gabriel. "Metropolitan Archdiocese of Köln (Germany)". GCatholic.org. (for Chronology of Bishops) ^{[self-published]}
