= Agilulfus of Cologne =

Saint Agilulfus of Cologne
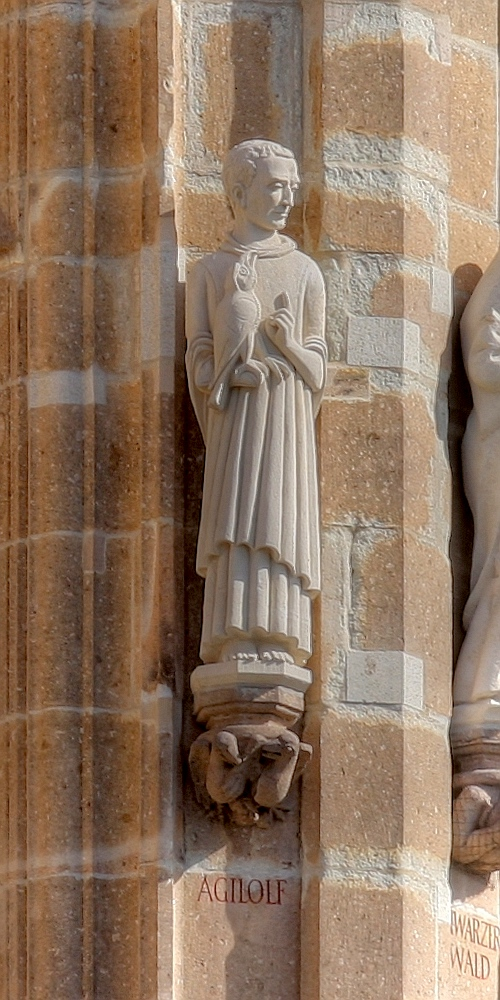
- Statue of Agilulfus at the Tower of Cologne City Hall

Bishop, Martyr
- Born: unknown Germany
- Died: c. 750; Germany
- Venerated in: Roman Catholic Church, Orthodox Church, True Orthodox Church including Tikhonites.
- Canonized: Pre-congregation
- Major shrine: Kölner Dom
- Feast: March 31st

Saint Agilulfus (or Agigulf), Abbot of Stavelot, Bishop of Cologne and martyr, died around the year 750.

Apart from his name, "the events of his life are uncertain", and an early account written by a monk of Malmedy is deemed untrustworthy.

Agilulfus came from a good family and was educated under Abbot Angelinus at Stavelot. A short time after succeeding as Abbot of Stavelot, Agilulfus became Bishop of Cologne. He is said to have tried to persuade King Pepin to leave his throne to someone other than Charles Martel, due to Charles' illegitimacy. Agilulfus' violent end soon after could be a result of Martel seeking revenge.

A letter of Pope Zachary in 747 commended Agilulfus for signing the "Charta verae et orthodoxae professionis."

Agilulfus was venerated in the Abbey at Malmedy as an abbot and martyr. In 1062 Bishop Anno brought his remains to the Church of Our Lady of the Steps at Cologne. His feast day is July 9.
