= Hilger de Burgis =

German Roman Catholic prelate

Most Reverend Hilger de Burgis
- Auxiliary Bishop of Cologne; Titular Bishop of Budua
- Church: Catholic Church
- Archdiocese: Archdiocese of Cologne
- In office: 1446-1452

Personal details
- Died: 1 November 1452 Cologne, Germany

Hilger de Burgis, O. Carm. (died 1452) was a Roman Catholic prelate who served as Auxiliary Bishop of Cologne (1446-1452).

== Biography ==
Hilger de Burgis was appointed a priest in the Order of the Brothers of the Blessed Virgin Mary of Mount Carmel. In 1446, he was appointed during the papacy of Pope Eugene IV as Auxiliary Bishop of Cologne and Titular Bishop of Budua. He served as Auxiliary Bishop of Cologne until his death on 1 Nov 1452.

== See also ==
- Catholic Church in Germany

== External links and additional sources ==
- Cheney, David M. "Budua (Titular See)". Catholic-Hierarchy.org. (for Chronology of Bishops) ^{[self-published]}
- Chow, Gabriel. "Titular Episcopal See of Budua (Montenegro)". GCatholic.org. (for Chronology of Bishops) ^{[self-published]}
- Cheney, David M. "Archdiocese of Köln {Cologne}". Catholic-Hierarchy.org. (for Chronology of Bishops) ^{[self-published]}
- Chow, Gabriel. "Metropolitan Archdiocese of Köln (Germany)". GCatholic.org. (for Chronology of Bishops) ^{[self-published]}

Catholic Church titles
| Preceded by Johann Schedemeker | Titular Bishop of Budua; 1446–1452 | Succeeded by Johann von Wermigerode |
| Preceded by | Auxiliary Bishop of Cologne; 1446–1452 | Succeeded by |
