= Siege of Neuss =

1474–1475 siege in Europe

- Part of the Burgundian Wars
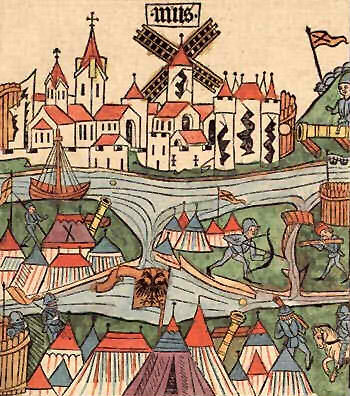
- The Siege of Neuss, from Geschichte Peter Hagenbachs und der Burgunderkriege (1477) by Konrad Pfettisheim
Date	29 July 1474 – 27 June 1475
Location	Neuss, Electorate of Cologne, Holy Roman Empire
Result	Siege abandoned after relief by Imperial forces.

Belligerents
Burgundian State Electorate of Cologne Electorate of the Palatinate Duchy of Guelders Duchy of Cleves–Mark Duchy of Jülich-Berg Savoyard mercenaries English archers	Imperial City of Cologne^{a} Imperial army

Commanders and leaders
Charles the Bold, Duke of Burgundy Frederick I, Elector Palatine Gerhard VII, Duke of Jülich-Berg	Herman of Hesse, Administrator of Cologne Frederick III, Holy Roman Emperor
- a: Cologne had been effectively independent of the Archbishopric-Electorate since the Battle of Worringen in 1288, but did not become de jure independent until granted Imperial immediacy in the aftermath of this siege.

The siege of Neuss, from 1474–75, was linked to the Cologne Diocesan Feud and part of the Burgundian Wars. The siege, led by Charles the Bold against the Imperial City of Neuss, was unsuccessful. Charles was compelled by the approach of a powerful Imperial army to raise the siege.

== Prelude ==
Under Charles's father, Philip the Good, Burgundy had allied itself to the cause of the newly-elected Archbishop of Cologne, Ruprecht. Ruprecht proved immensely unpopular, and by 1471, several major towns in the archbishopric, as well as the Kölners themselves, were on the verge of revolt. Attempts by the Emperor Frederick III to mediate the conflict failed, and in 1474 Charles the Bold signed a treaty with Ruprecht which stipulated that Charles would subdue the rebels and serve as Ruprecht's lifelong protector in return for 200,000 florins a year. To secure his western border, Charles concluded a treaty with Louis XI of France and then prepared to march into the Rhine valley; contemporaries suspected his real motive was the eventual reconquest of all of Alsace.

== Siege ==
Charles's route towards Cologne led him past Neuss, one of the centers of resistance against Ruprecht. Fearing the threat Neuss would pose to his exposed rear if left uninvested, Charles prepared to lay siege to the city, and the investment began on 29 July 1474. The Neussers, though they had had only a short time to prepare, laid in enough provisions to last until Christmas. They were led by Hermann, Landgrave of Hesse, and had the support of many nearby towns and cities.

Charles's army set up siege lines to the North and West of the city; the South and East were guarded by the rivers Krur and Rhine, respectively. Two large islands lay in the Rhine, however, and Charles decided to capture them, reasoning that he would then control passage along the Rhine (and thus prevent the city from being resupplied) and the water supply to the city's moat. Several assaults in early and mid-August eventually captured the islands, though with heavy losses; soon thereafter a bridge to one of the islands collapsed, drowning many of Charles' Italian soldiers. The Burgundians were also harried by hostile peasants.

In September Charles's Italians and English archers launched a 3,000-strong attack on one of Neuss' gates, which was repulsed. The next night, Kölners floated a fire-boat down the Rhine to destroy Charles' pontoon bridges, but the Burgundian river-fleet diverted it successfully. Shortly thereafter Charles' English archers, upset by the arrears of pay, began to cause trouble, and as Charles tried to calm them they opened fire. Charles was unharmed, but a rumor spread that the English had killed him, and enraged Burgundians began to slaughter the English until Charles presented himself to his army. Throughout the siege he worked tirelessly to keep up morale and to prosecute the siege, and it was a common belief that he slept fully armored for only a few hours a night.

The Neussers, bolstered by Hermann's Hessian troops and the support of Kölners, who skirmished with the Burgundians and smuggled provisions into the city while disguised as Italians, held out resolutely. Charles' men captured a German trying to swim the Rhine with a message that declared that Emperor Frederick was approaching with a huge army, and Charles redoubled his efforts, to no avail.

By May, Frederick was on the move, his army slowed by drunken brawls between soldiers from different regions of the Empire and by the need to recapture other cities from the Burgundians. But by the end of May he had arrived, and the Burgundians, after signing a provisional treaty, began to dismantle their siege works. At first, Burgundians, Imperials, and Kölners fraternized, but soon the Germans began to harass the Burgundians (the Kölners stole five Burgundian ships loaded with cannon), precipitating a sudden and violent assault on the unsuspecting Germans. Sporadic fighting continued until the papal legate present at the siege threatened to excommunicate both Charles and Frederick unless they ended the fighting; this threat, probably an idle one, enabled the two monarchs to conclude hostilities without losing face. The siege was finally terminated on 27 June 1475.

The failure of the siege of Neuss was attributed by the inhabitants of the city to the intervention of their patron saint, Quirinus of Neuss.

== In popular fiction ==
In Ash: A Secret History by Mary Gentle, the Siege of Neuss has the title character's mercenary company involved in a skirmish with Charles the Bold's forces.

The siege figures in Caprice and Rondo, book seven in Dorothy Dunnett's House of Niccolo series of historical novels.
