= Théodore Wichwael =

German Roman Catholic prelate

Most Reverend Théodore Wichwael
- Auxiliary Bishop of Cologne; Titular Bishop of Cyrene
- Church: Catholic Church
- Archdiocese: Archdiocese of Cologne
- In office: 1482–1503

Personal details
- Died: 3 March 1519 Cologne, Germany

Théodore Wichwael, O.S.A. or Dietrich Wichwael (died 1519) was a Roman Catholic prelate who served as Auxiliary Bishop of Cologne (1504–1519).

== Biography ==
Théodore Wichwael was appointed a priest in the Order of Saint Augustine. On 2 Aug 1504, he was appointed during the papacy of Pope Julius II as Auxiliary Bishop of Cologne and Titular Bishop of Cyrene. He served as Auxiliary Bishop of Cologne until his death on 3 Mar 1519.

== External links and additional sources ==
- Cheney, David M. "Cyrene (Titular See)". Catholic-Hierarchy.org. (for Chronology of Bishops) ^{[self-published]}
- Chow, Gabriel. "Titular Episcopal See of Cyrene (Libya)". GCatholic.org. (for Chronology of Bishops) ^{[self-published]}
- Cheney, David M. "Archdiocese of Köln {Cologne}". Catholic-Hierarchy.org. (for Chronology of Bishops) ^{[self-published]}
- Chow, Gabriel. "Metropolitan Archdiocese of Köln (Germany)". GCatholic.org. (for Chronology of Bishops) ^{[self-published]}
