= Ricolf =

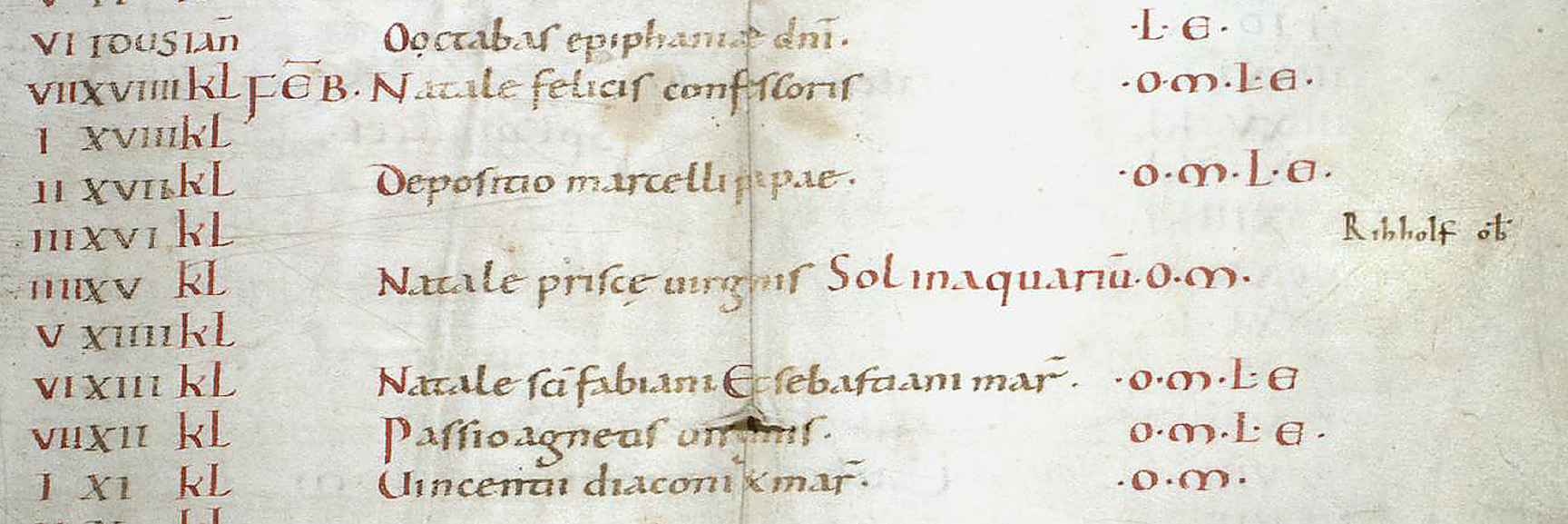
Memorial entry for the 16th of January in the Cologne Cathedral Library

Ricolf was bishop of Cologne in the eighth century, from 763 to 784. There was also a lord Ricolf in Flanders, who settled Ricolvingahem (now the Rijkeghem kouter near Tielt), during the reign of Louis the Pious, the successor of Charlemagne between 814 and 840. He is mentioned als Riculfus in the archives of the Saint Peter's Abbey, Ghent, as having ceded one of his subjects to the abbey.
