= Archbishop of Cologne =

Archbishop governing the Archdiocese of Cologne

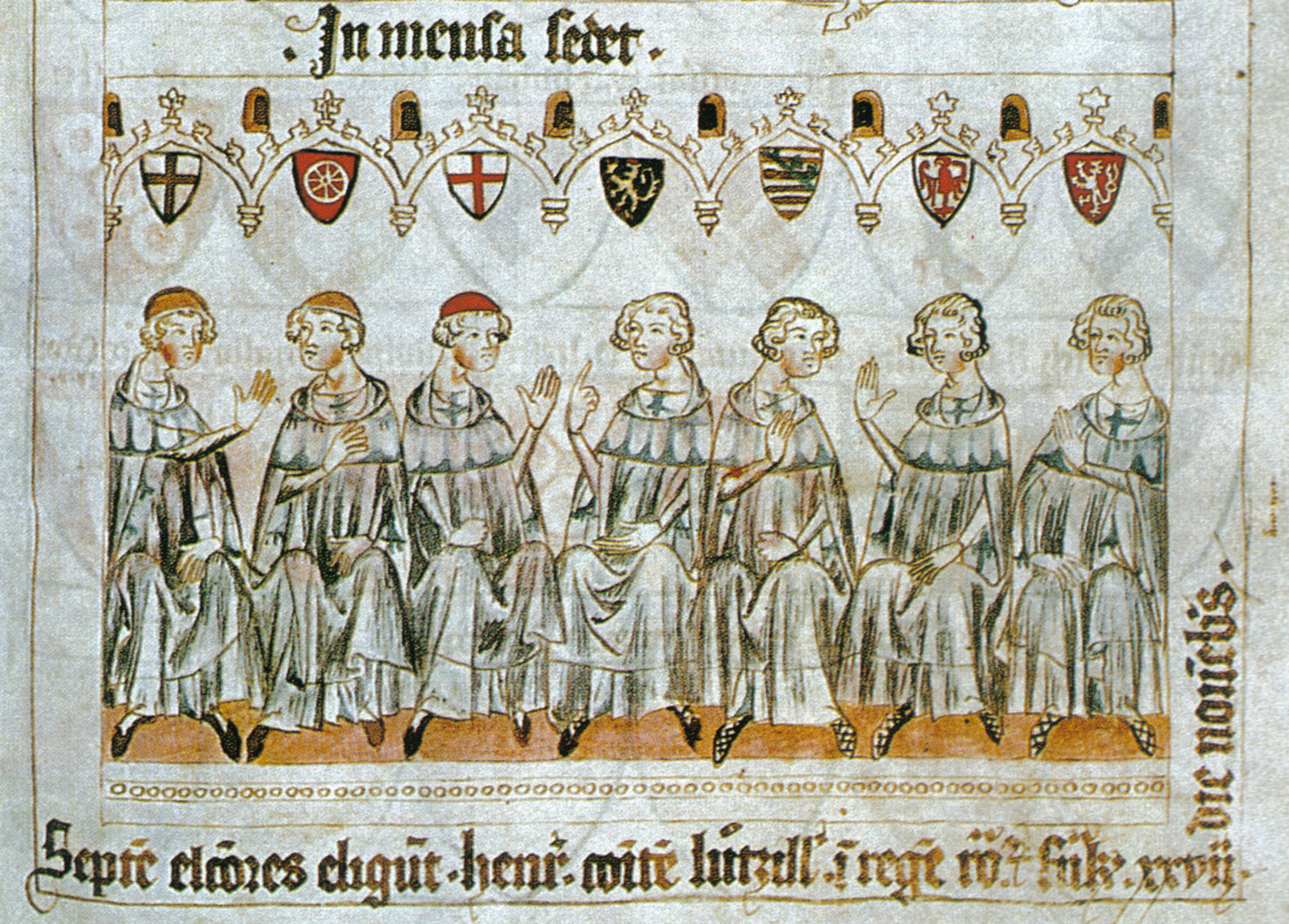
The "Seven Prince Electors" electing Henry, Count of Luxembourg as Henry VII, Holy Roman Emperor at Frankfurt on 27 November 1308. At far left is Heinrich II of Virneburg, Archbishop of Cologne. Codex Balduini Trevirorum, c. 1340)

The Archbishop of Cologne governs the Roman Catholic Archdiocese of Cologne in western North Rhine-Westphalia. Historically, the archbishop was ex officio one of the prince-electors of the Holy Roman Empire and ruled the Electorate of Cologne.

Since the early days of the Catholic Church, there have been 94 bishops and archbishops of Cologne. Four of them resigned in response to impeachment. Eight were coadjutor bishops before they took office. Seven were appointed as coadjutors freely by the pope. One moved to the Curia, where he became a cardinal. Additionally, six were chairmen of the German Bishops' Conference.

Cardinal Rainer Woelki has been Archbishop of Cologne since his 2014 transfer from Berlin, where he was also cardinal-archbishop.

== Bishops and archbishops of Cologne ==
=== Bishops of Colonia Agrippina, 88–784 ===
All names before Maternus II are to be approached with considerable skepticism, as little contemporary evidence is available. Maternus was present at a council in Rome in 313. The bishops between Severinus and Charentius are also apocryphal. Domitianus was the Bishop of Maastricht (Mosa Traiectum). The given dates of office before Gunther are also conjectural, at best.

- Maternus I c. 88–128
- Paulinus
- Marcellinus
- Aquilinus
- Levoldus c. 248–285
- Maternus II c. 285–315
- Euphrates c. 315–348
- Severinus c. 348–403
- Ebergisil I ? c. 403–440
- Solatius c. 440–470
- Sunnovaeus c. 470–500
- Domitianus fl. c. 535
- Charentinus fl. c. 570
- Eberigisil II ? c. 580–600 ?
- Remedius c. 600 ? –611 ?
- Solatius c. 611 ? –622
- Cunibert c. 623–663
- Bodatus c. 663–674
- Stephen 674–680
- Adelwin 680–695
- Giso 695–708
- Anno I 708–710,
- Faramund 710–713
- Agilolf 713–717
- Reginfried 718–747
- Hildegar 750–753
- Bertholm 753–763
- Rikulf 763–784

=== Archbishops of Cologne, 784–1238 ===
- Hildebold 784–818
- Hadbold 818–842
- Hildwin 842–849
- Günther 850–864
- Hugo Welf 864
- Wilbert 870–889
- Hermann I 890–924
- Wigfried 924–953
- Bruno I 953–965
- Volkmar 965–969
- Gero 969–976
- Warin 976–984
- Ebergar 984–999
- Heribert 999–1021
- Pilgrim 1021–1036
- Hermann II 1036–1056
- Anno II 1056–1075
- Hildholf 1076–1078
- Sigwin 1078–1089
- Hermann III 1089–1099
- Friedrich I 1100–1131

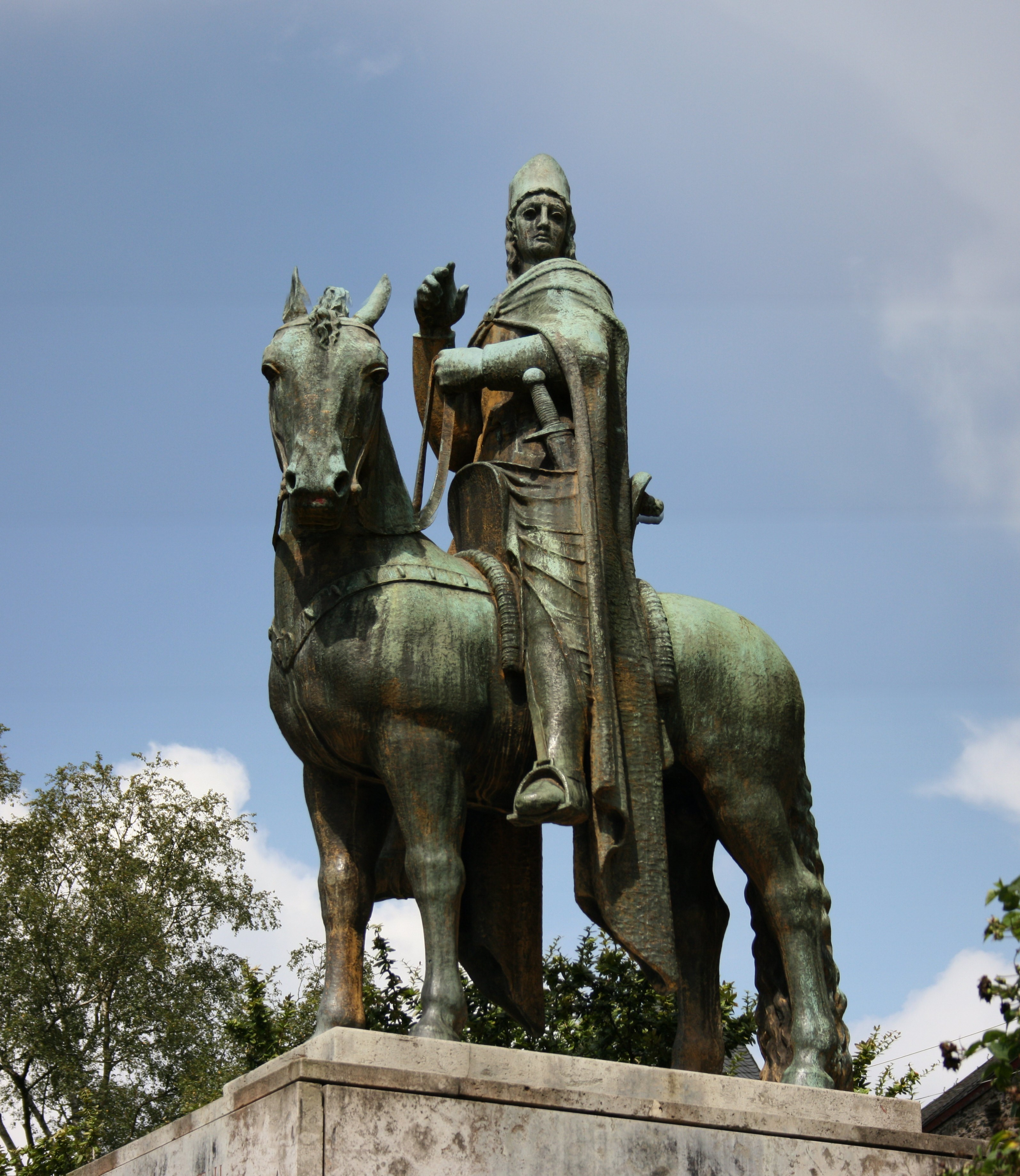
Saint Engelbert II of Berg, Archbishop of Cologne

- Bruno II von Berg 1131–1137
- Hugo von Sponheim 1137
- Arnold I 1138–1151
- Arnold II von Wied 1152–1156
- Friedrich II von Berg 1156–1158, nephew of Bruno II von Berg above
- Rainald of Dassel 1159–1167
- Philipp von Heinsberg 1167–1191, he gained the title of Duke of Westphalia and Angria in 1180, from then on held in personal union by all incumbents of the Cologne see until 1803.
- Bruno III von Berg 1191–1192, brother of Friedrich II above
- Adolf I von Berg 1192–1205, nephew of Bruno III above
- Bruno IV von Sayn 1205–1208 (in opposition)
- Dietrich I von Hengebach 1208–1215 (in opposition)
- Engelbert II von Berg 1216–1225, nephew of Bruno III above
- Heinrich I von Mulnarken 1225–1237

=== Archbishop-electors of Cologne, 1238–1803 ===
Image	Name	From	To	Notes
	Konrad von Hochstaden	1238	1261	
	Engelbert II von Falkenburg	1261	1274	
	Siegfried II of Westerburg	1274	1297	
	Wikbold I von Holte	1297	1304	
	William of Jülich	1304	1304	Elected in April 1304, but killed in the Battle of Mons-en-Pévèle before being appointed by the pope.
	Heinrich II von Virneburg	1304	1332	
	Walram von Jülich	1332	1349	
	Wilhelm von Gennep	1349	1362	First Elector of Cologne under the Golden Bull of 1356
	Adolf II von der Marck	1363	1363	
	Engelbert III von der Marck	1364	1369	
	Kuno II von Falkenstein (coadjutor)	1370	1371	
	Friedrich III. von Saarwerden	1372	1414	
	Dietrich II von Moers	1414	1463	
	Ruprecht of the Palatinate	1463	1480	
	Hermann IV of Hesse	1480	1508	
	Philip II of Daun-Oberstein	1508	1515	
	Hermann V von Wied	1515	1546	Sought to reform religious practice in the Electorate; converted to Protestantism; deposed and excommunicated.
	Adolf III of Schauenburg	1546	1556	
	Anton of Schauenburg	1556	1558	
	Gebhard I von Mansfeld-Vorderort	1558	1562	A founding member of the Schmalkaldic League
	Friedrich IV of Wied	1562	1567	
	Salentin von Isenburg-Grenzau	1567	1577	Upon the deaths of his younger and older brothers, there were no more brothers to carry on the family name; he left Church administration in 1577, married, had two sons and conducted a successful military career. He died in 1610.
	Gebhard II Truchsess von Waldburg	1577	1583	Converted to Calvinism in 1582; married Agnes von Mansfeld-Eisleben (cousin once removed of the archbishop and Prince-Elector Gebhard I von Mansfeld-Vorderort); Competing archbishop elected; Cologne War decides the outcome.
	Ernest of Bavaria	1583	1612	Brother of William V, Duke of Bavaria; Papal Nunciature established permanently in Cologne.
	Ferdinand of Bavaria	1612	1650	Brother of Maximilian I, Elector of Bavaria, nephew of Ernest of Bavaria. Principle of Secundogeniture.
	Maximilian Henry of Bavaria	1650	1688	First cousin of Ferdinand Maria, Elector of Bavaria
	Joseph Clemens of Bavaria	1688	1723	Brother of Maximilian II Emanuel, Elector of Bavaria. Put under Imperial ban for siding with France in the War of the Spanish Succession.
	Clemens Augustus I of Bavaria	1723	1761	Brother of Charles, Elector of Bavaria and Emperor. Last Wittelsbach to hold the office.
	Maximilian Frederick of Königsegg-Rothenfels	1761	1784	
	Maximilian Franz of Austria	1784	1801	The electorate's left-bank territories were seized and annexed by France in 1795. Son of Empress Maria Theresa and second patron of Ludwig van Beethoven.
	Anton Viktor of Austria	1801	1803	The electorate's remaining territories were secularized and given to the Landgrave of Hesse-Darmstadt in 1803.

=== Modern archbishops of Cologne: 1824 to date ===
- Ferdinand August von Spiegel 1824–1835
- Clemens August II Droste zu Fischering 1835–1845
- Cardinal Johannes von Geissel 1845–1864
- Cardinal Paul Melchers 1866–1885
- Cardinal Philipp Krementz 1885–1899
- Hubert Theophil Simar 1899-1902
- Cardinal Anton Hubert Fischer 1902–1912
- Cardinal Felix von Hartmann 1912–1919
- Cardinal Karl Joseph Schulte 1920–1941
- Cardinal Josef Frings 1942–1969
- Cardinal Joseph Höffner 1969–1987
- Cardinal Joachim Meisner 1988–2014
- Cardinal Rainer Maria Woelki since 2014

== Auxiliary bishops ==
- Johannes Schleeter, O.F.M. (1434–1457)
- Hilger de Burgis, O. Carm. (1446–1452)
- Heinrich Unkel, O.F.M. (1481–1482)
- Johann Spenner (Spender), O.F.M. (1482–1503)
- Théodore Wichwael, O.S.A. (1504–1519)
- Jean Bourgeois (1506–?)
- Arnald de Arceto, O.S.A. (1517–?)
- Quirin Op dem Veld von Willich (1521–1537)
- Johann Nopel der Ältere (1539–1556)
- Johann Pennarius, O.F.M. (1557–1563)
- Theobald Craschel (1574–1587)
- Laurentius Fabritius (1588–1600)
- Johann Nopel der Jüngere (1601–1605)
- Theodor Riphaen (1606–1616)
- Gereon Otto von Gutmann zu Sobernheim (1616–1638)
- Georgius Pauli-Stravius (1640–1661)
- Richard Paul Stravius (1641–1654)
- Adrian Walenburch (1661–1669)
- Peter Walenburch (1670–1675)
- Paul Aussem (1676–1679)
- Johann Heinrich von Anethan (1680–1693)
- Johann Peter Burmann (1694–1696)
- Godefroid-Udalric de La Margelle (1696–1703)
- Johannes Werner von Veyder (1703–1723)
- Franz Kaspar von Franken-Siersdorf (1724–1770)
- Karl Aloys von Königsegg und Rothenfels (1770–1796)
- Klemens August Maria von Merle (1797–1810)
- Karl Adalbert von Beyer, O. Praem. (1826–1842)
- Anton Gottfried Claessen (1844–1847)
- Johann Anton Friedrich Baudri (1849–1893)
- Hermann Joseph Schmitz (1893–1899)
- Anton Hubert Fischer (1889–1903, Appointed Archbishop of Cologne)
- Joseph Müller (1903–1921)
- Peter Joseph Lausberg (1914–1922)
- Franz Rudolf Bornewasser (1921–1922)
- Josef Stoffels (1922–1923)
- Hermann Joseph Sträter (1922–1931)
- Josef Hammels (1924–1944)
- Wilhelm Stockums (1932–1956)
- Wilhelm Cleven (1950–1983)
- Joseph Ferche (1947–1965)
- Augustinus Frotz (1962–1983)
- Hubert Luthe (1969–1991)
- Peter Nettekoven (1975–1975)
- Josef Plöger (1975–1991)
- Klaus Dick (1975–2003)
- Rainer Maria Woelki (2003–2011; Appointed Archbishop of Berlin)
- Walter Theodor Jansen (1983–1994)
- Norbert Trelle (1992–2005)
- Friedhelm Hofmann (1992–2004)
- Manfred Melzer (1995–2015)
- Heiner Koch (2006–2013)
- Dominik Schwaderlapp (2012–)
- Ansgar Puff (2013–)
- Rolf Steinhäuser (2015–)

== See also ==
- Roman Catholic Archdiocese of Cologne
- Cologne Cathedral

== Bibliography ==
- De Maesschalck, Edward (2019). De Graven van Vlaanderen (861-1384) [The Counts of Flanders (861-1384)] (in Dutch) (2nd ed.). DavidsFonds / Standaard uitgeverij. ISBN 9789002268458.
- Verbruggen, J.F.; Falter, Rolf (2001). 1302 Opstand in Vlaanderen [1302 Revolt in Flanders] (in Dutch). Tielt: Lannoo. ISBN 9020944126.
