= Drelincourt =

Drelincourt is a French surname, and may refer to:

- Charles Drelincourt (1595–1669), a French Protestant divine
- His sons:
  - Laurent Drelincourt (1626–1681), a French Protestant pastor
  - Charles Drelincourt (1633–1697), a French physician
  - Peter Drelincourt (1644–1722), Dean of Armagh
    - Mary Drelincourt (c. 1678–1755), Welsh benefactor and wife of Peter Drelincourt
