= Theobald Craschel =

German Roman Catholic prelate

Most Reverend Theobald Craschel
- Auxiliary Bishop of Cologne; Titular Bishop of Cyrene
- Church: Catholic Church
- Archdiocese: Archdiocese of Cologne
- In office: 1574–1587

Orders
- Consecration: 8 Sep 1574 by Johannes Kridt

Personal details
- Born: 1511 Aachen, Germany
- Died: 31 July 1587 (aged 75–76) Cologne, Germany

Theobald Craschel (1511–1587) was a Roman Catholic prelate who served as Auxiliary Bishop of Cologne (1574–1587).

== Biography ==
Theobald Craschel was born in Aachen, Germany in 1511. On 5 May 1574, he was appointed during the papacy of Pope Gregory XIII as Auxiliary Bishop of Cologne and Titular Bishop of Cyrene. On 8 Sep 1574, he was consecrated bishop by Johannes Kridt, Auxiliary Bishop of Münster. He served as Auxiliary Bishop of Cologne until his death on 31 Jul 1587.

== External links and additional sources ==
- Cheney, David M. "Cyrene (Titular See)". Catholic-Hierarchy.org. (for Chronology of Bishops) ^{[self-published]}
- Chow, Gabriel. "Titular Episcopal See of Cyrene (Libya)". GCatholic.org. (for Chronology of Bishops) ^{[self-published]}
- Cheney, David M. "Archdiocese of Köln {Cologne}". Catholic-Hierarchy.org. (for Chronology of Bishops) ^{[self-published]}
- Chow, Gabriel. "Metropolitan Archdiocese of Köln (Germany)". GCatholic.org. (for Chronology of Bishops) ^{[self-published]}
