= Matthias Emich =

German Roman Catholic prelate

Most Reverend Matthias Emich
- Auxiliary Bishop of Mainz; Titular Bishop of Cyrene
- Church: Catholic Church
- Diocese: Diocese of Mainz
- In office: 1476–1480

Orders
- Consecration: 8 Jun 1477

Personal details
- Died: 24 May 1480 Mainz, Germany

Matthias Emich, O. Carm. (died 1480) was a Roman Catholic prelate who served as Auxiliary Bishop of Mainz (1476–1480).

== Biography ==
Matthias Emich was ordained a priest in the Order of the Brothers of the Blessed Virgin Mary of Mount Carmel. On 16 Aug 1476, he was appointed during the papacy of Pope Sixtus IV as Auxiliary Bishop of Mainz and Titular Bishop of Cyrene. On 8 Jun 1477, he was consecrated bishop. He served as Auxiliary Bishop of Mainz until his death on 24 May 1480. While bishop, he was the principal co-consecrator of Ludwig von Helmstatt, Bishop of Speyer (1478).

== External links and additional sources ==
- Cheney, David M. "Cyrene (Titular See)". Catholic-Hierarchy.org. (for Chronology of Bishops) ^{[self-published]}
- Chow, Gabriel. "Titular Episcopal See of Cyrene (Libya)". GCatholic.org. (for Chronology of Bishops) ^{[self-published]}
- Cheney, David M. "Diocese of Mainz". Catholic-Hierarchy.org. (for Chronology of Bishops) ^{[self-published]}
- Chow, Gabriel. "Diocese of Mainz (Germany)". GCatholic.org. (for Chronology of Bishops) ^{[self-published]}
