= Hermann of Wied =

Roman Catholic archbishop (1477–1552)

The Most Reverend Hermann of Wied
- Archbishop-Elector of Cologne
- Church: Lutheran (from 1542); Roman Catholic (until 1542)
- Archdiocese: Cologne
- See: Cologne
- Appointed: 14 March 1515
- Term ended: 16 April 1546
- Predecessor: Philip II of Daun-Oberstein
- Successor: Adolf III of Schauenburg

Personal details
- Born: 14 January 1477
- Died: 15 August 1552 (aged 75)

Hermann of Wied (German: Hermann von Wied) (14 January 1477 – 15 August 1552) was the Archbishop-Elector of Cologne from 1515 to 1546.

Hermann was the son of Frederick I, count of Wied.

In 1521, he supported a punishment for German reformer Martin Luther, but later opened up one of the Holy Roman Empire's most important archbishoprics to the Protestant Reformation.

== Biography ==
Hermann was educated for the Church, and became elector and archbishop in 1515. He supported the claims of Charles V, whom he crowned at Aachen in 1520. At first, his attitude towards the reformers and their teaching was hostile. At the Diet of Worms, he endeavored to have Luther declared an outlaw.

A quarrel with the papacy turned, or helped to turn, his thoughts in the direction of church reform, but he hoped this would come from within rather than from without. He was initially a proponent of the Erasmian agenda of reform, which recognized certain corrupt and infelicitous religious practices but proposed no serious doctrinal change.

Over time, his program for change expanded, and his evangelical sympathies became more pronounced. With the aid of his friend Johann Gropper, he began, about 1536, to institute certain reforms in his own diocese. One step led to another, and, as all efforts at union with the Catholic Church failed, he appointed Martin Bucer his court preacher in Bonn in 1542, and sought out advice from Luther's compatriot, Philip Melanchthon on the doctrinal portion of the Wied’s church orders, Cologne Ordinances (Didagma [Einfaltigs Bedencken einer Christlichen Reformation]), published in 1544. A revised Latin version, Simplex ac Pia Deliberatio, was published in 1545 and was an influence on Thomas Cranmer's Common Book of Prayer in England.

His formal break with Rome was hailed by the Protestants, and the Schmalkaldic League declared they were resolved to defend him; but the Reformation in the electorate was set back by the military victories of Emperor Charles V over William, duke of Cleves, and moreover his protestant theology found very little support among the people of Cologne. Summoned both before emperor and pope, Hermann was deposed and excommunicated by Pope Paul III in 1546. He resigned his office in February 1547, and retired to Wied.

Hermann was also Prince-Bishop of Paderborn from 1532 to 1547.

== Publications ==
His publications include;

- Nostra Hermanni ex gratia Dei Archiepiscopi Coloniensis (1545)
- The right institutio[n] of baptisme (1548)

Hermann of Wied Counts of Wied Born: 14 January 1477 Died: 15 August 1552 Altwied Castle (a part of today's Neuwied)
Catholic Church titles
Regnal titles
Preceded by Philip II of Daun-Oberstein	Archbishop-Elector of Cologne and Duke of Westphalia and Angria as Hermann V 1515–46	Succeeded by Adolf III of Schauenburg
Preceded by Eric of Brunswick-Grubenhagen	Prince-Bishop of Paderborn as Hermann II; 1532–47	Succeeded by Rembert of Kerssenbrock
