= Bernhard Heinrich Overberg =

German Roman Catholic ecclesiastic, educator and author

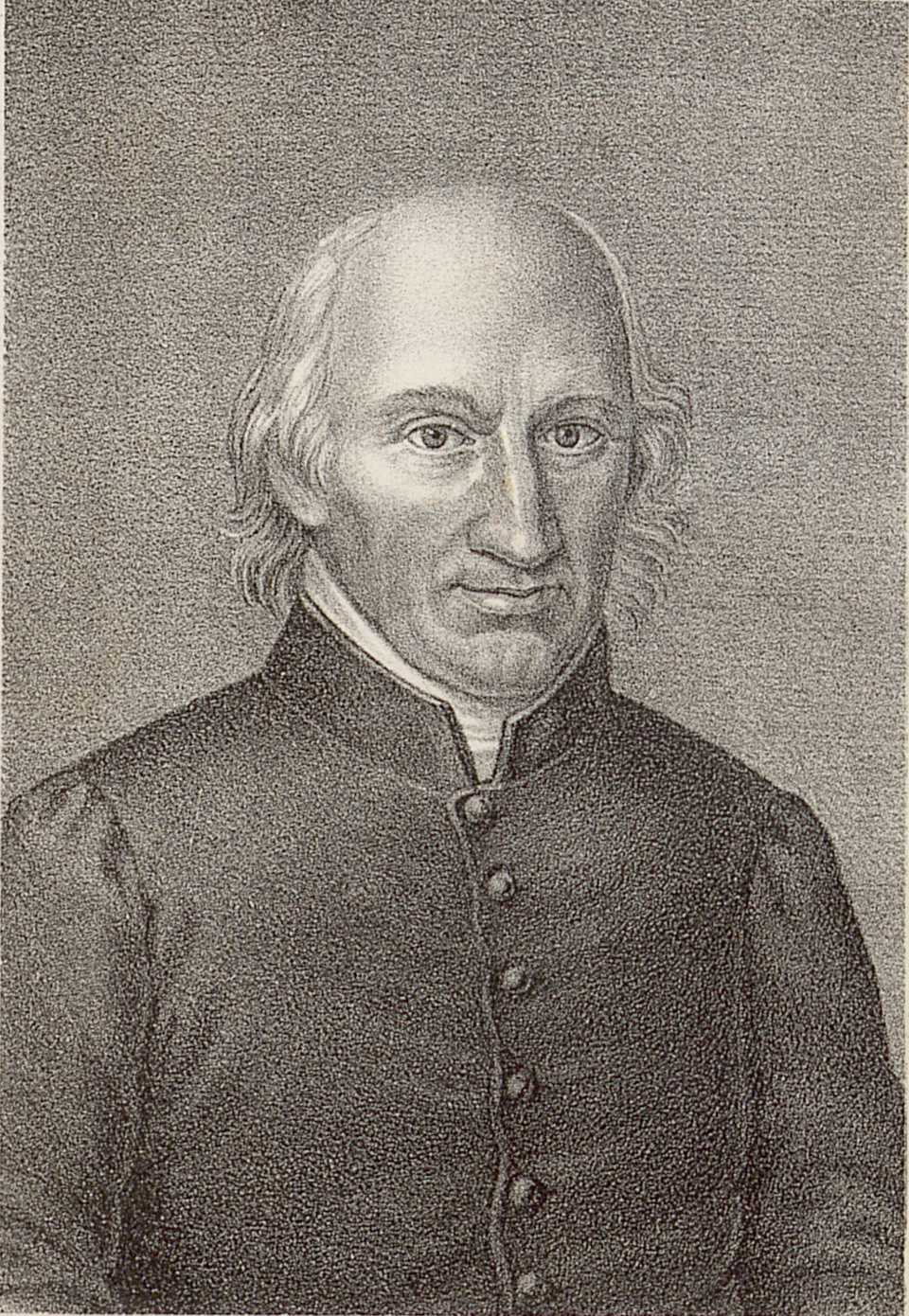
Bernhard Heinrich Overberg

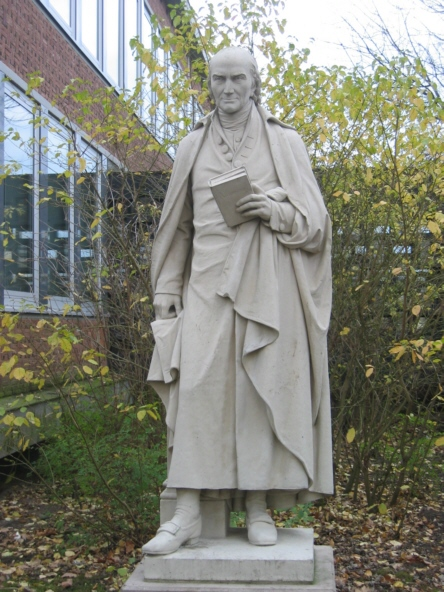
Statue of Bernhard Heinrich Overbergs at Overberg-Kolleg in Münster

Bernhard Heinrich Overberg (1 May 1754 – November 8, 1826) was a German Roman Catholic ecclesiastic, educator and author. As an instructor of the teachers he shaped the educational level in Münster and Westphalia.

== Youth ==
Overberg was born of peasant parents in the village of Höckel, near Osnabrück, and became a pedlar like his father. At fifteen a priest prepared him for college, and he studied with the Franciscans in Rheine. From 1774 he studied in Münster, and was ordained priest in 1779.

== Normal school ==
At this time, the schools in Germany were very poor. A 1580 edict from Christian I, Elector of Saxony had made sacristans serve as schoolteachers, in addition to their other duties, which left them little time or interest in teaching. By Overberg's day, schools in Prussia were often taught by discharged non-commissioned officers, while in Westphalia the teachers-cum-sacristans often worked a third job as day-labourers. Overberg wrote to the Archbishop Maximilian Friedrich von Königsegg-Rothenfels, complaining that the poor pay could not attract good teachers.

In 1783, the vicar-general, Freiherr von Furstenberg, resolved to found a normal school in Münster. This school would offer a course of practical and theoretical study for schoolteachers during the autumn vacation, paid for at public expense; teachers who passed the final examination would receive an increase in salary. Impressed by Overberg's teaching work as curate in Everswinkel, Furstenberg offered Overberg a position as director of the school.

At first, Overberg himself instructed the teachers; later, as the school grew from twenty pupils to more than a hundred, he employed an assistant. Overberg gave five lessons daily between 21 August to November, and taught method as well as the various school subjects. He accepted women into his school, making it Germany's first training course for female teachers.

In 1789, Princess Adelheid Amalie Gallitzin visited the school and found herself so impressed that she enrolled her son, Demetrius Augustine Gallitzin. Under Overberg's influence, Gallitizin returned to her childhood Catholicism, taking Overberg as her confessor and spiritual advisor. Overberg became part of her circle of close friends, alongside Furstenberg, philosophers Johann Georg Hamann and François Hemsterhuis, and poet Friedrich Leopold zu Stolberg-Stolberg.

Overberg remained director of the school until his death in 1826, despite holding other positions in the meantime.

== Other work ==
Besides teaching in his school, Overberg gave instruction in the catechism for twenty-seven years in the Ursuline convent without remuneration. Every Sunday he recapitulated all that he had lectured upon during the week in a public lecture which was attended by people of all classes, especially by students of theology.

Overberg became regent of the ecclesiastical seminary in 1809, before which he had been for some time synodal examiner and member of the Landschulkommission.

In 1818 he was awarded 1818 the Prussian Red Eagle, and in 1823, honorary member of the cathedral chapter.

Overberg died 8 November 1826. His grave is located in the choir of the Überwasserkirche in Münster, where he was dean and pastor. In 2004, Voltlage commemorated the 250th anniversary of his birth with a number of events. Bishop Franz-Josef Bode from Osnabrück celebrated the closing mass of the festival year. Numerous educational institutions and streets are named after Overberg.

== Works ==
- Anweisung zum zweckmässigen Schulunterricht (1797) (Instructions for practical school lessons for the school teachers in the Hochstifte Münster)
- Biblische Geschichte (1799)
- Christkatholisches Religionsbuch (1804)
- Katechismus der christlichen Lehre (1804)
- Sechs Bücher vom Priesterstande (1858)
