= Schmettau (noble family) =

German noble family

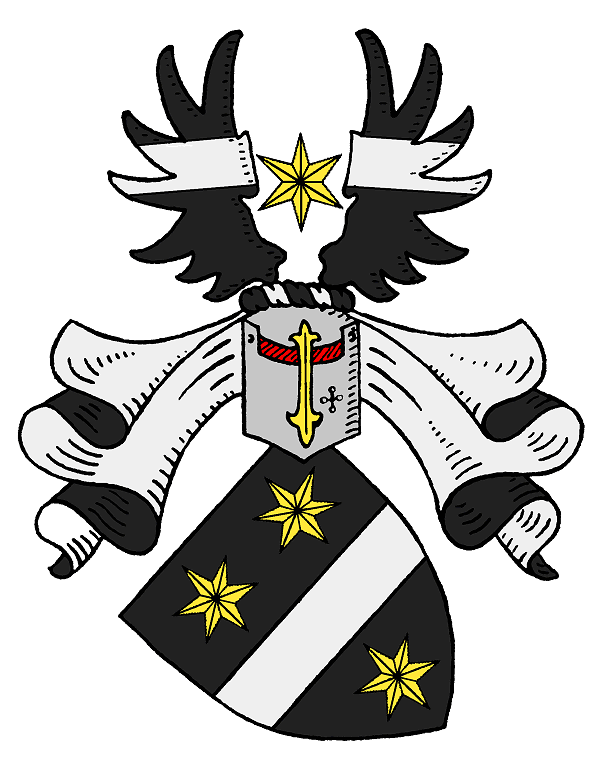
Family coat of arms of Schmettau (Schmettow)

The House of Schmettau, or Schmettow, is the name of an old and influential Silesian noble family, which belonged to German nobility.

== History ==
The family first appeared in Hungary and Serbia under the name Szmettay in the 14th century. The first records of the lineage of the family begin with Georg Smete, documented from 1562 to 1579, citizen and farmer in Neisse. Under King Matthias Corvinus, the family initially spread to Silesia, from which individual members of the family settled in Mecklenburg, Brandenburg and Denmark.

== Titles ==
On September 28, 1668, the family received a renewal diploma for her nobility and coat of arms from the Emperor Leopold I, and in 1701 was promoted to the status of "free lord". On February 17, 1717, Emperor Charles VI gave the family a baron diploma and on February 24, 1742, Emperor Charles VII elevated the family to the rank of count / earl, which King Frederick the Great recognized on July 2 of the same year. In 1822 another Prussian nobility diploma was awarded.

== Members ==
- Wolfgang von Schmettau (1648–1711), minister and diplomat
- Gottlieb von Schmettau (1665–1722), Saxonian general
- Samuel von Schmettau (1684–1751), Prussian Generalfeldmarschall, since 1742 Graf
- Karl Christoph von Schmettau (1696–1775), Prussian officer, generalleutnant
- Johann Ernst von Schmettow (1703–1774), Prussian officer, generalmajor
- Gottfried Heinrich von Schmettau (1710–1762), Prussian minister
- Bernhard Alexander Gottfried von Schmettau (1748–1816), Prussian officer, generalmajor
- Hermann Woldemar von Schmettau (1719–1785), general gouverneur of Norway
- Karl Wilhelm Friedrich von Schmettau (1734–1798), Prussian officer, generalleutnant
- Amalie von Schmettau, (1748–1806), salonnist
- Woldemar Friedrich von Schmettau (1749–1794), writer and diplomat
- Friedrich Wilhelm von Schmettau (1743–1806), Prussian generalleutnant, cartograph and owner of castle Köpenick
- Bernhard von Schmettow (1787–1872), Prussian politician and member of the Prussian House of Lords (1866–1872)
- Ferdinande von Schmettau (1798–1875),
- Bernhard Gottfried Emil von Schmettow (1818–1889), Prussian politician, member of the Prussian House of Lords
- Bernhard Gottfried Karl von Schmettow (1846–1912), Prussian politician, member of the Prussian House of Lords
- Willibald Bernhard Gottfried von Schmettow (1848–1927), German generalleutnant
- Egon von Schmettow (1856–1942), Prussian General of the Cavalry in the First World War
- Max Philipp von Schmettau (1857–1929), German generalleutnant
- Eberhard von Schmettow (1861–1935), German generalleutnant in the First World War and generaladjutant of the Emperor
- Richard von Schmettow (1865–1938), German generalleutnant
- Rudolf von Schmettow (1891–1970), German generalleutnant
- Johannes Graf von Schmettow, Egon Zehnder International
- Bernhard Graf von Schmettow (1930–2012), social worker in Essen
- Carola Gräfin von Schmettow, CEO of HSBC Trinkaus & Burkhardt
- Leontine Gräfin von Schmettow (* 1962), german journalist and filmauthour
- Mechthild Reichsgräfin von Schmettau (* 1965), judge at Bundesgerichtshof
