= Clemens August Droste zu Vischering =

German Catholic prelate (1773–1845)

His Excellency Clemens August Droste zu Vischering
- Archbishop of Cologne
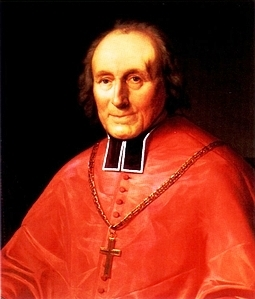
- Church: Roman Catholic
- Archdiocese: Cologne
- Appointed: 1 December 1835
- In office: 1835-1845
- Predecessor: Ferdinand August von Spiegel
- Successor: Johannes von Geissel
- Previous post: Auxiliary Bishop of Münster (1827-1835)

Orders
- Ordination: 14 May 1798
- Consecration: 28 October 1827 by Kaspar Maximilian Droste zu Vischering
- Rank: Archbishop

Personal details
- Born: 21 January 1773 Vorhelm (now a part of Ahlen), North Rhine-Westphalia, Germany
- Died: 19 October 1845 (aged 72) Münster, Germany

Baron Clemens August Droste zu Vischering (German: Clemens August Freiherr von Droste zu Vischering; 21 January 1773 – 19 October 1845) was an Archbishop of Cologne. His clashes with the Prussian government were characteristic of the conflict between the Catholic church and the Prussian-Protestant state power in 19th-century Germany.

== Early life ==
Clemens August was born in Vorhelm (now a part of Ahlen, North Rhine-Westphalia) into the Westphalian noble family of Droste zu Vischering. His great-grandniece was Maria Droste zu Vischering.

Besides attending the University of Münster, he had as private tutor the church historian Johann Theodor Katerkamp (died 1834). At an early age, he was introduced into the circle of learned men who gathered around Baron Franz Friedrich Wilhelm von Fürstenberg, Vicar-General of the Diocese of Münster, and Princess Amelia von Gallitzin.

After completing his studies he began, in June 1796, an extensive Grand Tour, under the direction of Katerkamp, through Germany, Switzerland, and Italy, returning to Münster in August 1797.

== Early career ==
On 14 May 1798, he was ordained priest by his brother Kaspar Maximilian Droste zu Vischering, Auxiliary Bishop of Münster. As a canon, he devoted himself to pastoral care.

In accordance with the wish of the aged Baron von Fürstenberg, Administrator of the Diocese of Münster, the cathedral chapter elected Droste zu Vischering as his coadjutor on 18 January 1807, and when Fürstenberg resigned six months later, Droste zu Vischering became his successor as Vicar-General.

As administrator, he founded in 1808 an independent congregation of Sisters of Mercy, the so-called Klemens-Schwestern, who were primarily involved in nursing. When in 1813 Münster became part of Napoleon's empire, the emperor appointed Ferdinand August von Spiegel as Bishop of Münster without the knowledge of the pope, but after Napoleon's fall, the pope restored Droste zu Vischering to his former office in March 1815.

Under Prussian rule, the administrator repeatedly came into conflict with the government on account of his attitude towards the education of children of mixed marriages and the supervision of theological studies. When an 1821 agreement between the Holy See and the Prussian government assured the dioceses of Prussia of further episcopal appointments, Droste zu Vischering retired from Diocese administration and devoted himself to works of piety and charity. He remained in seclusion even after being consecrated Auxiliary Bishop of Münster, with the titular see of Calama in 1827.

== Archbishop of Cologne ==
After the death of Count von Spiegel, the incumbent of the metropolitan see of Cologne, the Prussian government, to the surprise of Catholics and Protestants alike, desired Droste zu Vischering as his successor. This unexpected move on the part of the government was intended to conciliate the Catholic nobility of Westphalia and Rhenish Prussia as well as the Catholic clergy and laity, who began to lose confidence in the fairmindedness of the government and protested against the open favouritism shown to Protestants in civil and ecclesiastical affairs.

The cathedral chapter of Cologne, primarily at the request of Crown Prince (later King Friedrich Wilhelm IV), elected Droste zu Vischering as Archbishop of Cologne on 1 December 1835. He received the papal confirmation on 1 February 1836, and was solemnly enthroned by his brother, Maximilian, Bishop of Münster, on 29 May. Soon after this he came into conflict with the adherents of Georg Hermes (died 1831), whose doctrines had been condemned by Pope Gregory XVI on 26 September 1835. When many professors at the University of Bonn refused to submit to the papal bull, Droste zu Vischering refused the imprimatur to their theological magazine, forbade the students of theology to attend their lectures, and drew up a list of anti-Hermesian theses to which all candidates for sacerdotal ordination and all pastors who wished to be transferred to new parishes were obliged to swear adherence.

The government was angered because the archbishop had enforced the papal bull without the royal approbation, but gave him to understand that it would allow him free scope in this affair, provided he would accede to its demands concerning mixed marriages. Before Droste zu Vischering became archbishop he was asked by an agent of the government whether, if he should be set over a diocese, he would keep in force the agreement regarding mixed marriages, which was made "in accordance with the papal Brief of 25 March 1830", between Archbishop von Spiegel and Minister Bunsen on 19 June 1834. Droste zu Vischering did not then know in what this agreement consisted. Lipgen states that he deliberately failed to apprise himself of the contents. Relying on the words "in accordance with the papal Brief", he answered in the affirmative. After becoming archbishop he discovered that the agreement in question, far from being in accordance with the papal Brief, was in some essential points in direct opposition to it. The papal Brief forbade Catholic priests to celebrate mixed marriages unless the Catholic training of the children was guaranteed, while in the agreement between von Spiegel and Bunsen no such guarantee was required. Under these circumstances, Droste zu Vischering believed it was his duty to ignore the government in favor of the papal brief.

Advised by Minister Bunsen, Frederick William III ordered the arrest of the archbishop. The order was carried on the evening of 20 November 1837, and Droste zu Vischering was transported as a criminal to the fortress of Minden. His arrest made him an important symbolic figure for the freedom of the Catholic church. In response, Bishops of Münster and Paderborn, fired by the example of Clemens August, revoked the assent they had formerly given to the agreement; while Martin von Dunin, the Archbishop of Gnesen (Gniezno) and Posen (Poznań), was imprisoned at Kolberg (Kołobrzeg) for the same offence that had sent Droste zu Vischering to Minden.

In an allocution of 10 December 1837, Pope Gregory XVI praised the course of the Archbishop of Cologne and solemnly protested against the action of the government. The Darlegung, or exposé, in which the government attempted to defend its course by accusing the archbishop of treason, is alleged to be slanderous by Roman Catholics. It was, according to their view, refuted by Joseph Görres in his great apologetical work Athanasius, and a declaration of the Roman view of true state of affairs was published at Rome by order of the pope. The archbishop was set free on 22 April 1839. He was permitted to retain the title of Archbishop of Cologne, but, in order to uphold the authority of the state in the public eye, was prevailed upon to select a coadjutor in the person of Johann von Geissel, Bishop of Speyer, who henceforth directed the affairs of the archdiocese. The allegedly slanderous accusations of the above-mentioned Darlegung were publicly retracted by Frederick William IV, who had meanwhile succeeded to the throne. In 1844 the archbishop went to Rome, where he was most kindly received by the pope and the Curia. The cardinalate, which was offered him by the pope, he refused with thanks and returned to Münster in October. He died there in 1845.

== Works ==
Droste zu Vischering wrote a few ascetical and ecclesiastico-political works. The most important is an exposition of the rights of church and state entitled Über den Frieden unter der Kirche und den Staaten, published at Münster in 1843. Another work of importance is his Über die Religionsfreiheit der Katholiken (1817).

== Sources ==
- "Droste-Vischering, Clemens August" . Encyclopædia Britannica. Vol. 8 (11th ed.). 1911. p. 591. Droste zu vischering

Catholic Church titles
Preceded by Ferdinand August von Spiegel	Archbishop of Cologne; 1835–1845	Succeeded by Johannes von Geissel
