= Ferdinand August von Spiegel =

Archbishop of Cologne from 1824 until 1835

His Excellency Ferdinand August Spiegel
- Archbishop of Cologne
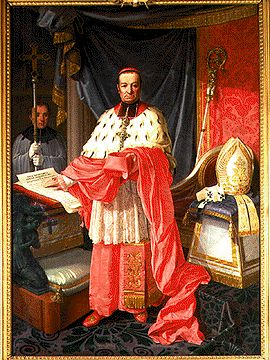
- Church: Roman Catholic
- Archdiocese: Cologne
- Appointed: 20 December 1824
- In office: 1825-1835
- Predecessor: Archduke Anton Victor of Austria
- Successor: Clemens August von Droste-Vischering

Orders
- Ordination: 6 December 1799
- Consecration: 11 June 1825 by Josef von Hommer
- Rank: Archbishop

Personal details
- Born: 25 December 1764 Marsberg, Holy Roman Empire
- Died: 2 August 1835 (aged 70) Cologne, German Confederation
- Buried: Cologne Cathedral
- Parents: Theodor Hermann von Spiegel and Adolphine Franziska von Landsberg zu Erwitte
- Motto: Mit Gott Und Mit Ehren
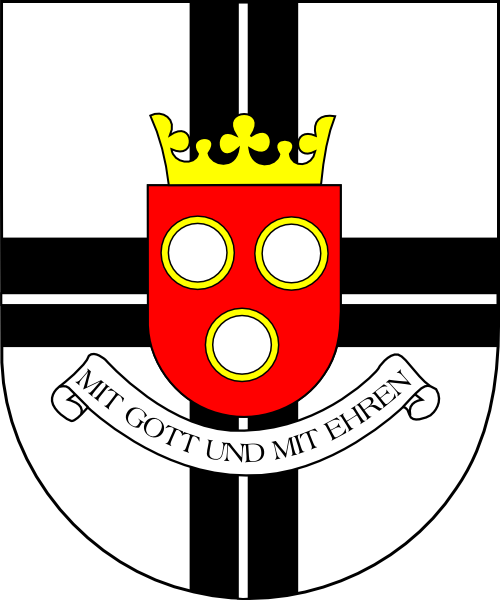
- Coat of arms

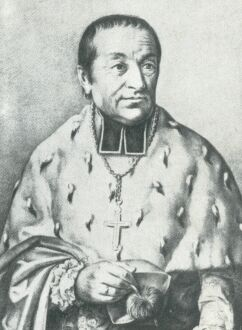
Archbishop Count Ferdinand August Spiegel

Count Ferdinand August von Spiegel zum Desenberg und Canstein (25 December 1764, in Marsberg – 2 August 1835, in Cologne) was Archbishop of Cologne from 1824 until 1835.

== Early career ==
He was the fifth son of Theodor Hermann von Spiegel zum Desenberg und Canstein (1712–1779), the Landdrost (Lord High Steward) of the Duchy of Westphalia who had ruled that province from 1758 in the service of the Elector-Archbishop of Cologne and Duke of Westpahlia, Clemens August of Bavaria. Descendant of an old Westphalian noble family and raised at Canstein Castle, Marsberg, Ferdinand August von Spiegel studied theology, law and economics at Fulda and Münster. There he became a canon in 1783, whereupon he received the tonsure and the lower orders. Educated in the spirit of the Enlightenment, Spiegel was in no way inclined to the status of clergy from which he only hoped for greater career opportunities, as did his elder half-brother Franz Wilhelm (1752–1815), who in 1758 succeeded his father and in 1786 became finance minister of the Electorate of Cologne. In 1788, Ferdinand August himself applied in vain for the Westphalian Landdrost position. However he obtained further canon benefices, in Osnabruck and Hildesheim. He was ordained a subdeacon in 1793.

In 1790, he accompanied the Elector-Archbishop of Cologne and Bishop of Münster, Archduke Maximilian Francis of Austria, to the coronation of the latter's brother Emperor Leopold II, in Frankfurt am Main. Always striving for a leading position, he succeeded in being appointed Geheimrat in the Prince-Bishopric of Munster in 1796, especially since he had already shown enormous talent in administration as a vidame. In 1796, he was ordained deacon, but was not appointed vicar general as he had hoped. In 1799, he received ordination as priest. In August 1802, Prussian troops occupied Munster and Ferdinand August lost his secular office. But soon he was in good agreement with the Prussians and worked closely with them, especially since he hoped that this would give him a position in the secular administration. In February 1803, he managed to prevent the Münster cathedral chapter from being dissolved. In the confusion of the Napoleonic Wars, he largely withdrew from the public until 1810.

But soon he was heard and respected by the French, so that on April 14, 1813, he was appointed Bishop of Münster by Emperor Napoléon. However, since he had concerns about the legality of an appointment without papal confirmation, he let the cathedral chapter elect him to be the second capitular vicar, to whom the actual capitular vicar, his eternal opponent Clemens August von Droste-Vischering, had to relinquish all competences. In these years, which were filled with an enormous amount of activity, Spiegel spiritually changed to be a truly religious Christian. After the fall of Napoleon, he again managed to establish close ties with the Prussians, whose benevolence he immediately regained. Hoping to become Minister of Culture, he renounced the diocese of Münster in 1815.

From 1814 to 1815, he participated in the Vienna Congress, where he campaigned for a German national church independent of Rome. But since there was no settlement on church questions, he left. Although he had been denied a ministerial position, Frederick William III of Prussia created him a Count in 1816, together with his youngest brother, Caspar Philipp (1776–1837), an Austrian ambassador.

In these years his political position changed from an advocate of a State Church to one of ecclesiastical freedom, and he became a sub-delegate of the executor of the Papal bull De salute animarum (1821). The Prussian government was impressed by the prompt and impartial completion of this work, which involved sensitive personnel issues, by approaching him with the offer to take over the Archdiocese of Cologne. He apologized to Pope Pius VII for his uncanonical behavior in 1813, which not only earned him pardon, but also an otherwise unlikely prompt appointment. After the king had again personally asked him to take the office, Count Spiegel was appointed archbishop of Cologne by Pope Leo XII on December 20, 1824, and ordained bishop on June 11, 1825.

== Archbishop of Cologne ==
In the years that followed, Spiegel worked tirelessly and took all important decisions of his diocese himself. He was not always comforting the Prussian government, endeavoring to maintain the principle of ecclesiastical independence from the state. In the conflict over raising children in mixed-confessional marriages, he agreed with the Prussian government in 1834, and signed the so-called Berlin Convention. Contrary to his hope, this agreement with the state did not receive the necessary approval from Pope Gregory XVI. Before the mixed marriage dispute could break out openly, Ferdinand August, who had probably suffered from colon cancer since 1833, died on August 2, 1835, in Cologne. He was laid to rest in the archbishop's crypt of Cologne Cathedral. Clemens August von Droste-Vischering became his successor.

== Literature ==
- Rudolf Lill: Der Bischof zwischen Säkularisation und Kulturkampf, In: Peter Berglar et al. (eds.): Der Bischof in seiner Zeit. Bischofstypus und Bischofsideal im Spiegel der Kölner Kirche, Verlag J.P. Bachem, Köln 1986, pp. 349–396 (about Ferdinand August von Spiegel: pp. 358–367), ISBN 3-7616-0862-4

Catholic Church titles
Vacant Title last held by Anton Victor of Austria; 1801-1824 sede vacante	Archbishop of Cologne; 1824–1835	Succeeded by Clemens August von Droste-Vischering
