= Franz Friedrich Wilhelm von Fürstenberg =

German politician (1729–1810)

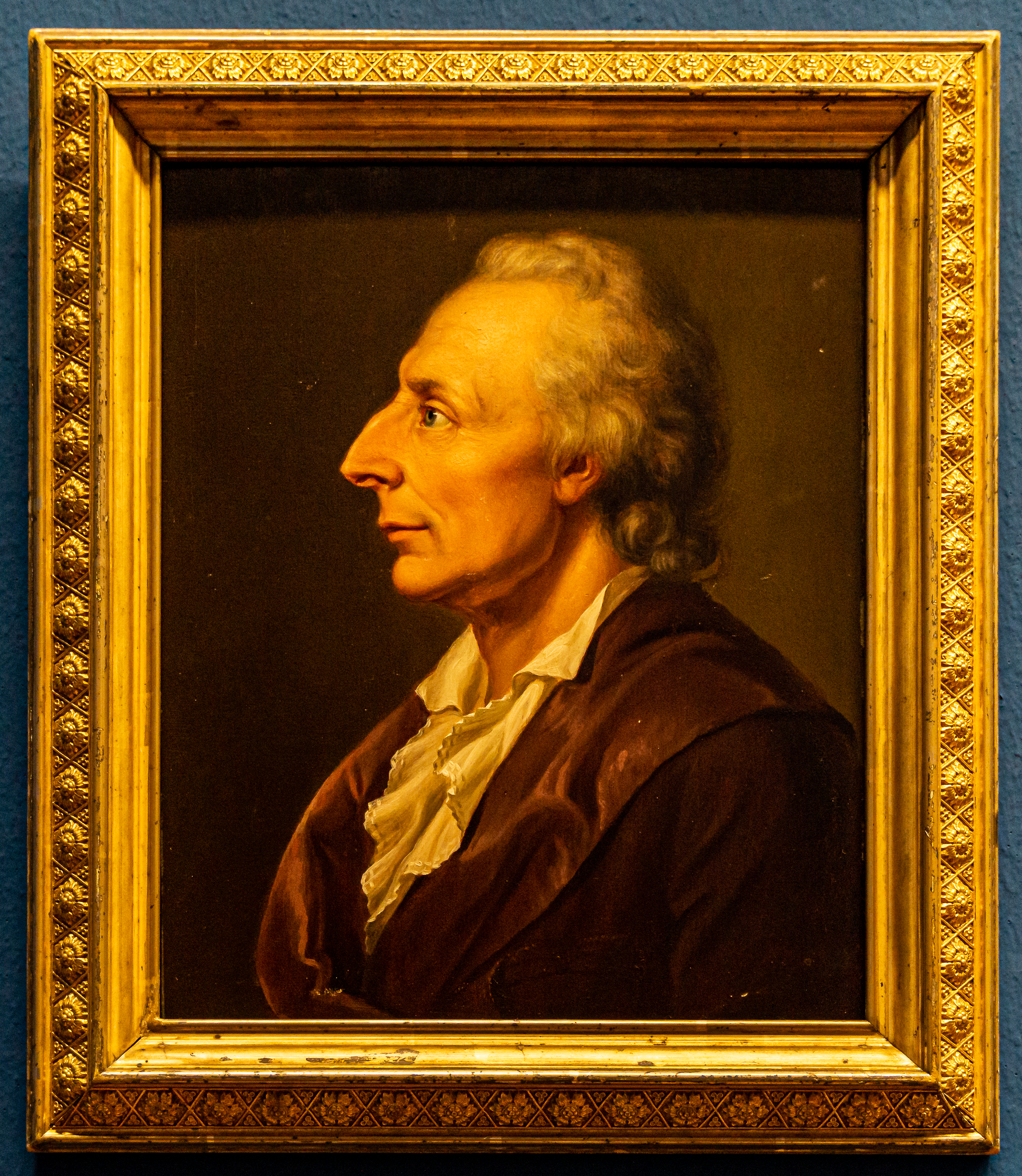
Franz von Fuerstenberg

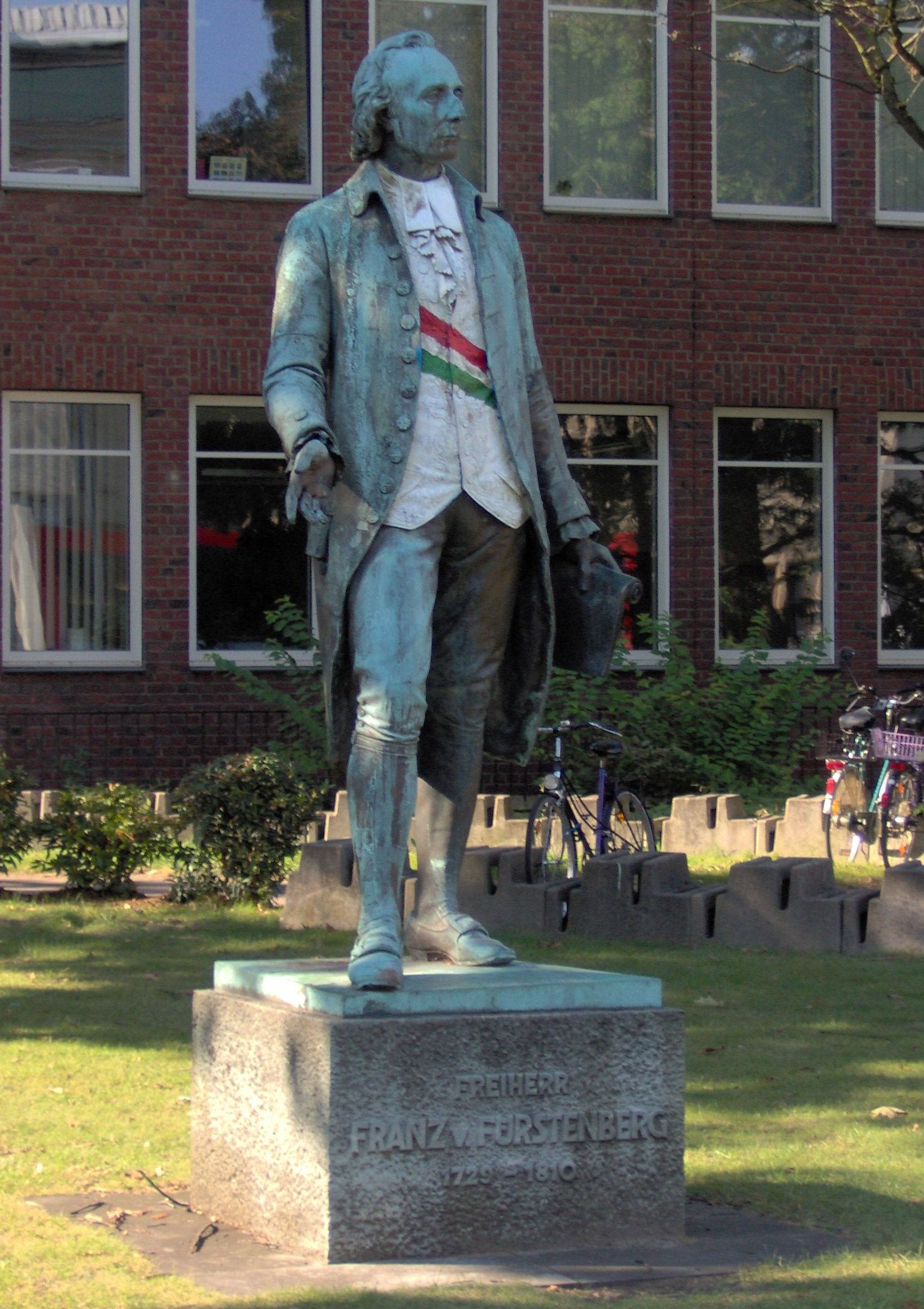
Franz Friedrich Wilhelm von Fürstenberg.

Franz Friedrich Wilhelm von Fürstenberg (7 August 1729 in Schloss Herdringen – 16 September 1810 in Münster) was a German politician and the most important statesman in the Principality of Münster in the second half of the 18th century. Fürstenberg was committed to a cautious and enlightened course of reform.

== Life ==
Franz Friedrich Wilhelm von Furstenberg was born 7 August 1729, at Herdringen in Westphalia. He was the son of Christian Franz Dietrich von Fürstenberg from the Westphalian noble family of Furstenberg, and Helene von Galen, daughter of Wilhelm Goswin Anton von Galen. His sister Maria Anna (1732–1788) was abbess in Fröndenberg Abbey.

After receiving his early education from private tutors, Franz studied from 1746 to 1748 at the Jesuit School in Cologne. In 1748 he became cathedral capitular in Münster and Paderborn. The cathedral chapter of Münster at that time traditionally consisted of sons of the Westphalian nobility. He received minor orders and the subdeaconship, though he had no intention of entering the priesthood.

From 1750 to 1751, he studied jurisprudence at the University of Salzburg, which he completed at the Sapienza in Rome in 1753. During the Seven Years' War (1756–1763) he rendered signal services to his country as intermediary between the opposing camps, and through his influence warded off many a calamity from the city and principality of Münster.

After the death of Clemens August, Elector of Cologne and Prince-Bishop of Münster, on 6 February 1761, it was chiefly through the influence of Fürstenberg that Maximilian Friedrich von Königsegg-Rothenfels, who had succeeded Clemens August at Cologne (6 April 1761), was also elected Prince-Bishop of Münster in September, 1762. In recognition for these services the new prince-bishop entrusted Fürstenberg with the temporal and spiritual administration of the Prince-Bishopric of Münster. In 1762 he appointed him privy councilor and minister and, in 1770, vicar-general and curator of educational institutions. No better man could have been found to manage the temporal and spiritual affairs of the Prince-Bishopric of Münster which had suffered severely during the Seven Years' War. Everybody was deep in debt and all trade and commerce was at a standstill. To restore prosperity to the people he improved agricultural conditions by dividing the land into marks, draining marshes and reclaiming much soil which hitherto had lain idle or in pasturage. He ameliorated the condition of the serfs and gave an impulse to the entire abolition of serfdom. In order to liquidate the public debt he placed a duty on such imported goods as could be easily dispensed with, and for a space of six years levied a moderate capitation tax from which the privileged estates were not exempted. He pushed through the taxation of the clergy against a storm of indignation. He improved the military and the sanitary system, the former by founding a military academy at Münster and by introducing something similar to the "Landwehr" or militia, the latter by founding a college of medicine (1773) and inducing its director, the learned Christopher Ludwig Hoffmann, to draw up a code of medicinal regulations which was justly admired through Germany as a model of its kind.

In 1780 Fürstenberg was dismissed from his ministerial office because he had campaigned for the introduction of a standing army, had plans to excavate a canal in the direction of the Rhine, and had encountered energetic resistance. Above all, however, he had unsuccessfully campaigned against the election of Maximilian Franz of Austria as co-adjutor of the Cologne Elector-Archbishop and Prince-Bishop of Münster Maximilian Friedrich, since he himself had aspired to succeed Maximilian as bishop of Münster. His younger brother Franz Egon succeeded in 1786 for Hildesheim and Paderborn.

== Educational reforms ==
The baron, however, remained vicar general until 1807 and kept the supervision over the school system, during whose reform his friend Bernhard Heinrich Overberg supported him above all. The school system was at the center of Fürstenberg's reforms. In 1776, the vicar general published a revolutionary "school order" for the grammar school, which changed the canon of subjects thoroughly in favor of mathematics and the natural sciences. This educational reform included a seminal commitment to mathematics, physics, and psychology as three "basic sciences". In 1773, he founded the Old University of Münster. In 1777, the general compulsory education in the Principality of Münster was tightened. Together with Bernhard Heinrich Overberg, he worked out a reorganization of elementary schools in the 1780s. On his initiative, a school experiment began in 1780 at the Gymnasium Paulinum: High German became a school subject. He initiated a reform of the Gymnasium, and founded the University of Münster and a seminary.

Fürstenberg was also an important stenographer. From 1761, he used the English stenography system of Aulay Macaulay for his diary entries in French and made his own creative changes within this system.

== Princess Amalie von Gallitzin ==
In Münster Fürstenberg belonged to the Catholic Münster Circle (familia sacra) around the Princess Amalie von Gallitzin, who lived in Münster since 1779 and with whom he had a close friendship. His letters to the princess are an important literary testimony of the century. After the French Revolution of 1789, Fürstenberg took intensive care of fleeing clerics from Flanders and Brabant, who were stranded in Münster, during the Revolutionary Wars and the Napoleonic Wars together with Amalie von Gallitzin.

Fürstenberg was buried at the Überwasserfriedhof in Münster; since 21 October 1929 his grave has been in the cemetery of the canons of St. Paul's Cathedral in Münster.

== Sources ==
- Esser, W. (1842). Franz von Fürstenberg. Dessen Leben und Wirken nebst seinen Schriften über Erziehung und Unterricht [Franz von Fürstenberg. His life and achievements, accompanied by his writings on education and teaching.]. Münster, Germany: J. H. Deiters.
