= Mystification (Diderot) =

1768 unfinished work by Denis Diderot

Mystification, or the story of the portraits
- 1954 second printing
- Author: Denis Diderot
- Original title: Mystification ou l'Histoire des portraits
- Illustrator: Picasso
- Language: French
- Genre: comédie de caractères
- Publication date: 1951
- Publication place: France

Mystification or l'Histoire des portraits is an unfinished work from 1768 by Denis Diderot. It was published in 1951. A second edition in 1954 by Pierre Daix, annotated by Yves Benot was illustrated with four sketches by Pablo Picasso, for Les Éditeurs français réunis. A film based on the work was directed by Sandrine Rinaldi in 2005.

== Plot ==
The story is based on a true story in which Diderot was also involved. The Russian Ambassador to France, Prince Dmitri Alekseyevich Gallitzin, wanted to marry the 19-year-old Amalie von Schmettau, but had given his former mistress Mlle d'Ornet (in Diderot spelled "Mlle Dornet") several portraits, which he wanted to retrieve before his marriage. The scene takes place in the Paris studio of the Prussian painter Anna Dorothea Therbusch (in Diderot spelled "Mme Therbouche"), where present are the painter, then Miss Dornet, who reclines ill on a sofa, a certain Bonvalet-Desbrosses, allegedly a Turkish doctor, and Diderot himself. The Prince, who is not present, has made use of the artist, the author and the doctor to diagnose to his former mistress that she can only be healthy when she separates herself from the mementos of her lover. The narrative is deliberately unfinished, according to the author, because of the interruption of the project due to the death of Bonvalet-Desbrosses.
