= Landscape with Hercules and Cacus =

Painting by Nicolas Poussin

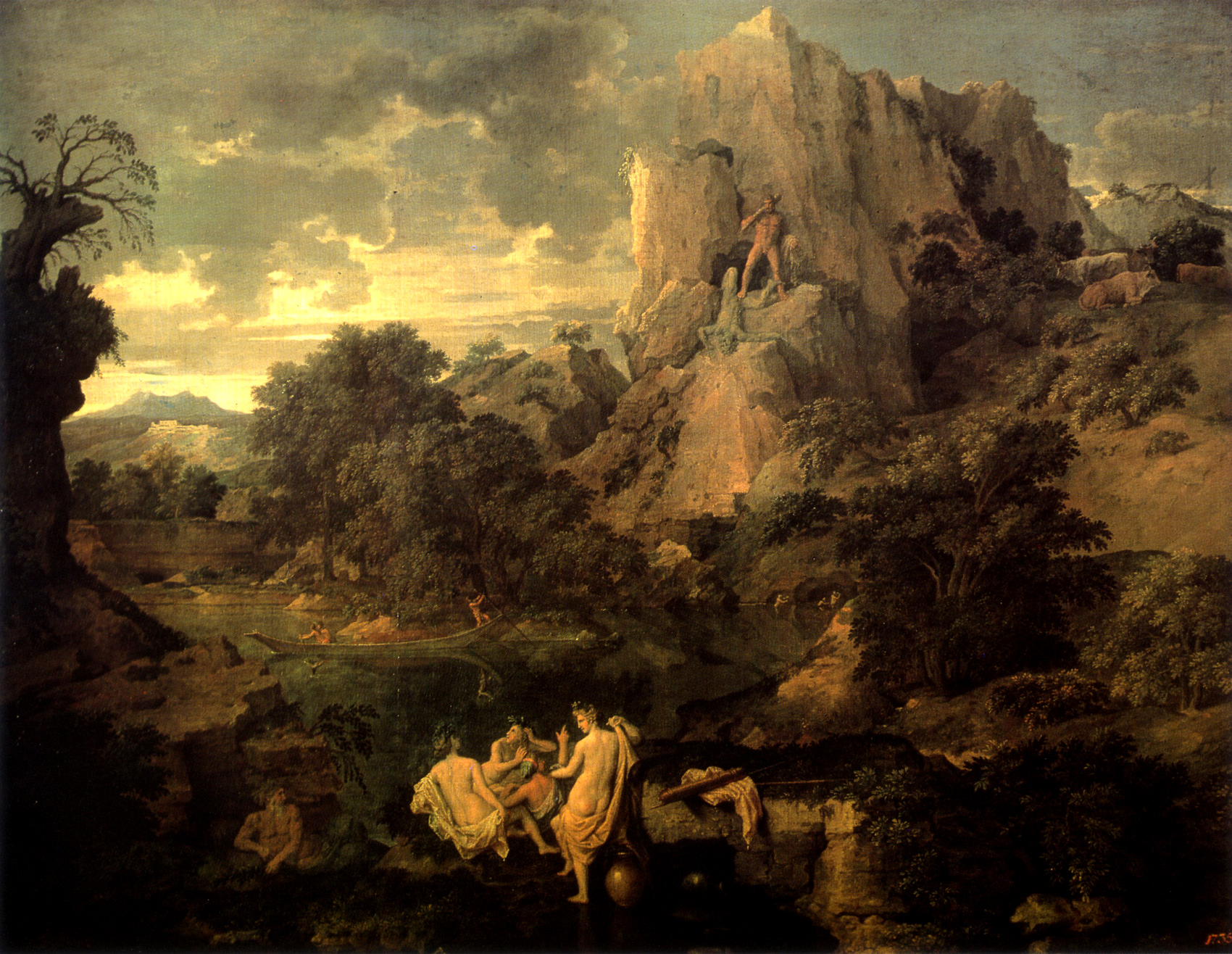
Landscape with Hercules and Cacus (c. 1660) by Nicolas Poussin

Landscape with Hercules and Cacus is an oil on canvas painting by French painter Nicolas Poussin, created c. 1660. It is held in the Pushkin Museum, in Moscow. It depicts a scene from lines 190-275 of Book VIII of Virgil's Aeneid.

Its early history is unknown. It and the same artist's Landscape with Polyphemus were bought by Denis Diderot for Catherine the Great for the Hermitage Museum. Diderot gave them both to Prince Dmitri Alekseyevich Gallitzin, who transported them to The Hague and thence to Saint Petersburg. Polyphemus remains in the Hermitage, whilst Hercules and Cacus was moved to its present home in 1930.

== See also ==
- List of paintings by Nicolas Poussin
