= Hemsterhuis =

Hemsterhuis is a surname. Notable people with the surname include:

- François Hemsterhuis (1721–1790), Dutch writer on aesthetics and moral philosophy
- Tiberius Hemsterhuis (1685–1766), Dutch philologist and critic, father of François
