= Dmitri Alekseyevich Golitsyn =

Russian diplomat and author

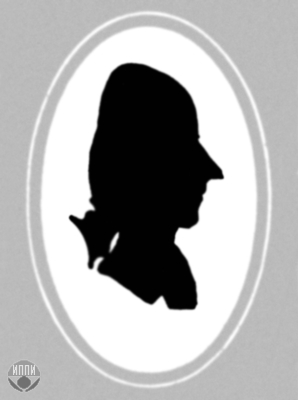
Profile of Dmitri Alekseyevich Golitsyn

Prince Dmitri Alekseyevich Golitsyn FRS (21 December 1728 – 16 March 1803) was a Russian diplomat, art agent, author, volcanologist and mineralogist. By birth he was a member of the House of Golitsyn. He was a supporter of the recognition of the United States, and participated in the drafting of the First League of Armed Neutrality. He was the first Russian educated person that made specific proposals on the abolition of serfdom in Russia.

== Life ==
Golitsyn, born in Saint Petersburg, was the son of Prince Alexei Ivanovich Golitsyn and Princess Daria Vassilevna Gagarina. In 1754 he was appointed at Collegium of Foreign Affairs. In 1760 he moved to Paris, where he made the acquaintance of Diderot, Voltaire, d'Alembert, and Claude Adrien Helvétius. After the coup in 1762 Catherine the Great appointed him ministre plenipotentiair to France. In 1764 he introduced Étienne-Maurice Falconet to the tsarina and acquired The Return of the Prodigal Son (Rembrandt) for the Hermitage Museum. It was through Prince Dmitri that Catherine purchased the destitute Diderot's library (1766), with the stipulation that he take care of the 2900 books, at an excellent salary. Though nominally an Orthodox Russian, he accepted and openly professed the principles of a rationalist philosophy. Golitsyn was one of the first Russians that promoted the ideas of the Physiocrats.

Golitsyn was involved in the Polish question and recalled to Russia as it seems to discuss another appointment. Passing through Aachen, he met the Countess Adelheid Amelie von Schmettau, the only daughter of the Prussian Field-Marshal Samuel von Schmettau. The nineteen-year-old Countess had accompanied Prince Augustus Ferdinand of Prussia (brother of Frederick the Great) and his wife Margravine Elisabeth Louise of Brandenburg-Schwedt to the spa. An unpublished story by Diderot, Mystification, recalls how Gallitzin used the French author and an alleged Turkish doctor to intervene with a former mistress before the marriage to retrieve portraits of her lover.

After her mother's consent they married in a chapel at Aix-la-Chapelle (Aachen) on 28 August 1768. On honeymoon the couple proceeded to St. Petersburg. Gallitzin acquired for the Hermitage many paintings from Heinrich von Brühl (1768), and in the following years from François Tronchin (1770) and Louis Antoine Crozat (1772).

=== Holland ===
In 1769 Prince Golitsyn was appointed ambassador to Holland. He left the Russian capital; en route they stopped in Berlin, where their first child, Princess Marianna was born (7 December 1769). Their second child, Prince Demetrius was born on 22 December 1770 in The Hague.

Houdon's portrait of Diderot, commissioned by the Russian ambassador Dmitri Alekseevich Golitsyn, and shown in terracotta at the Salon of 1771, was a critical milestone for the young sculptor. The prominence of the influential subject, the prestige of the patron, and the artistic power of the bust itself brought him to the attention of a wide circle inside France and at foreign courts—a power elite that formed his base of support in the absence of crown commissions.

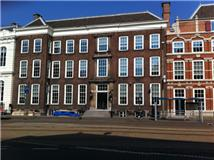
Kneuterdijk 22

In 1771 he acquired a dozen paintings after the death of Gerrit Braamcamp, but the valuable cargo on board of Vrouw Maria got lost near the coast of Finland in a storm. About two years later, the Ambassador and his wife hosted Diderot (two months in 1773) on his way to Saint Petersburg. On his way back in 1774 Diderot spent half a year in the Dutch Republic. In the same year the couple split and Princess moved from Kneuterdijk to a country house between The Hague and Scheveningen, the better to oversee raising her children in a way J.J. Rousseau had promoted in his "Emile, or On Education". There she met often with Frans Hemsterhuis, the philosopher, her teacher and council. Princess Wilhelmina of Orange, wife of stadtholder William V, and her eldest son were frequent visitors.

In 1776 he made a trip to London together with David-Louis Constant de Rebecque. In 1778, the sculptor Étienne Maurice Falconet visited The Hague on his way back from Russia for a long stay at Kneuterdijk, joined in July 1779 by the sculptor Marie-Anne Collot.

In July 1782 Tsarevich Paul and his wife came to visit and were received by Golitsyn. In December 1782 the Ambassador had to leave The Hague. His capacities as a diplomat during the First League of Armed Neutrality were not estimated as much as his scientific interest in mechanics and minerals. In 1783 he left Turin and returned to the Dutch Republic.

Golitsyn owned one of the biggest electrostatic machines, made of his own design. He corresponded with Comte de Buffon and cooperated with Jean Henri van Swinden. In spite of serious illness, the prince took his work seriously. Before his death, Golitsyn gave his collection to the Mineralogical Museum in Jena (a weight of 1850 kg, received in December 1802), and requested to place the samples according to the system of René Just Haüy.

== Recognition ==
Member of the director of the Dutch Society of Sciences (1777); Honorary member of the St. Petersburg Academy of Sciences (1778); Foreign Member of the Brussels Academy of Sciences (1778); Foreign member of the Swedish Academy of Sciences (1788); Foreign member of the Berlin Academy of Sciences (1793); Member of the German Academy of Natural Scientists Leopoldina (1795), Halle under the name of Maecenas III (1795); Foreign member of the Royal Society of London (1798); A member of the St. Petersburg Free Economic Society (1798); President of Jena Mineralogical Society (1799–1803).
