= Johann Theodor Katerkamp =

German church historian

Johann Theodor Katerkamp (January 17, 1764 – June 9, 1834) was a German Catholic church historian born in Ochtrup.

== Life ==
Johann Theodor Katerkamp was the son of a wealthy farmer, Johann Heinrich Eberhard and his wife Maria. Johann Theodor received his early education at the Progymnasium of the Franciscan Order in Rheine. In 1781 he went to the Gymnasium Paulinum in Münster. He studied theology and philosophy at the University of Münster from 1783 to 1787.

In 1787 Katerkamp received ordination, and for several years worked as a tutor for the sons of Baron Droste-Vischering in Münster. He took his two pupils, Klemens August Droste and Hans-Otto Droste, on a two-year educational journey through Germany, Switzerland, Italy and Sicily. Beginning in 1797 he resided in the home of Princess Amalie Gallitzin, where he remained working as a private tutor until the death of the princess in 1806.

In 1823 Katerkamp was appointed a canon at Münster Cathedral. He died in Münster, on 9 June 1834, Johann Theodor Katerkamp died there.

== Works ==
Katerkamp specialized in the field of patristics, and was the author of a highly acclaimed Kirchengeschichte (Church History), which was published in five volumes from 1823 to 1834. This work covered events of the Church up until the year 1153. Other significant works by Katerkamp were Ueber den Primat des Apostels Petrus und seiner Nachfolger (On the Primacy of the Apostle Peter and his Successors), and memorabilia from the life of Princess Amalie Gallitzin called Denkwürdigkeiten aus dem Leben der Fürstin Amalia von Gallitzin, gebornen Gräfin von Schmetta.
