= Archduke Anton Victor of Austria =

Archduke Anton Victor
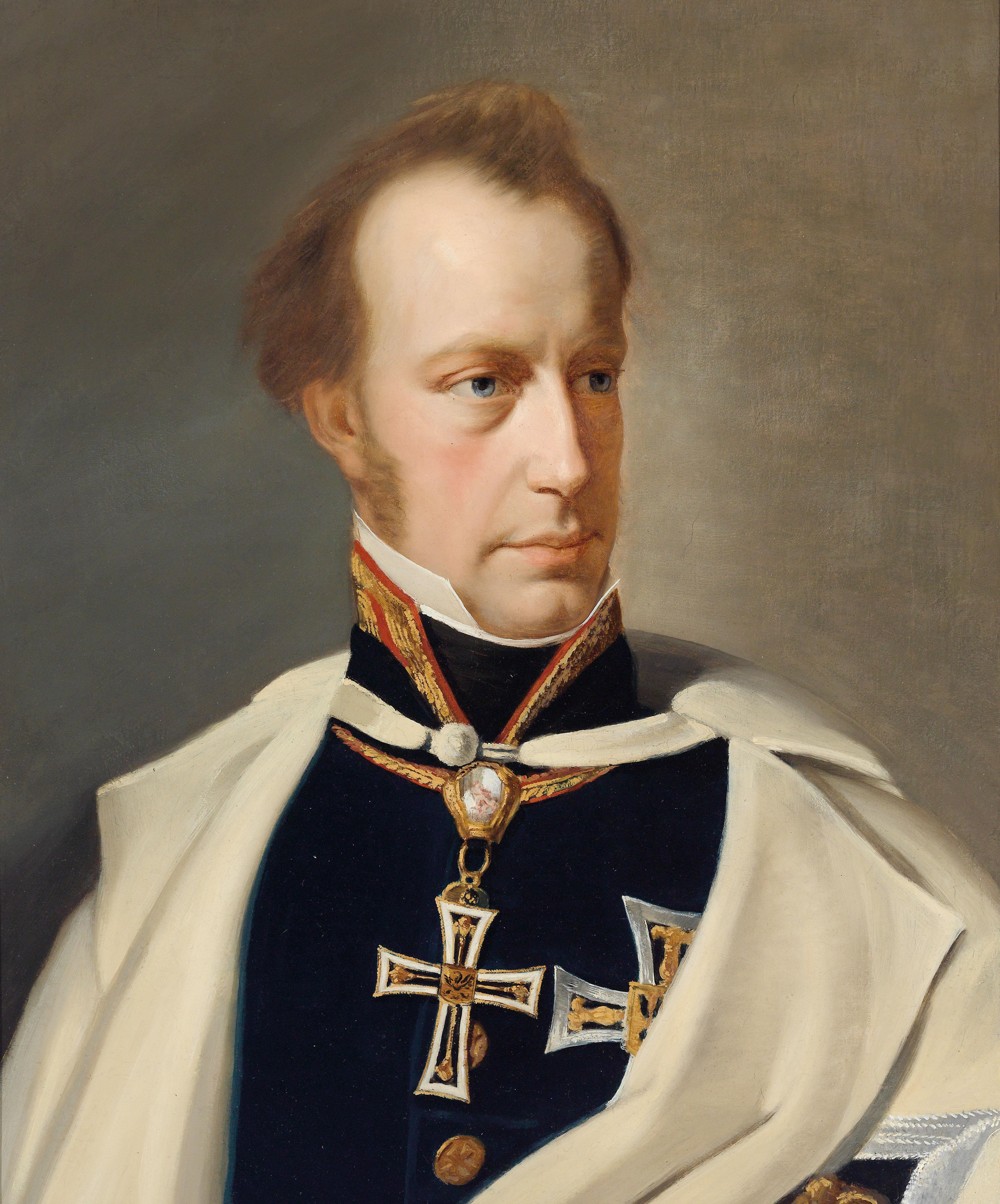
- Portrait attributed to Anton Einsle

Viceroy of Lombardy–Venetia
- In office: 7 March 1816 – 3 January 1818
- Monarch: Francis I
- Predecessor: Heinrich von Bellegarde (Lieutenant-General)
- Successor: Archduke Rainer
- Born: 31 August 1779; Florence, Grand Duchy of Tuscany
- Died: 2 April 1835 (aged 55); Vienna, Austrian Empire
- Burial: Imperial Crypt
- House: Habsburg-Lorraine
- Father: Leopold II, Holy Roman Emperor
- Mother: Maria Luisa of Spain

Anton Victor, Viceroy of Lombardy–Venetia (full German name: Anton Viktor Joseph Johann Raimund von Österreich; 31 August 1779 – 2 April 1835) was an Archduke of Austria and a Grand Master of the Teutonic Knights. He was also briefly the last Archbishop-Elector of Cologne (and Duke of Westphalia) and Prince-Bishop of Münster before those territories were secularised in 1803.

== Life ==
Anton Victor was the son of Leopold II, Holy Roman Emperor, and Maria Luisa of Spain. He was born in Florence and died in Vienna. He never married and died without issue.

After the death of his uncle, Maximilian Franz, Archbishop and Prince-Elector of Cologne and Prince-Bishop of Münster, Anton Victor was chosen on 9 September 1801 as Prince-Bishop of Münster and on 7 October as Archbishop and Prince-Elector of Cologne. The Electorate's Rhenish territories had been occupied by the French in 1794 and had in 1800 become part of France (in Cologne's case as sub-prefecture of the new département de la Roër, centred on Aix-la-Chapelle/Aachen), this state of affairs preventing Anton from taking his seat in Cologne Cathedral (which had in any case been reduced by the revolutionaries to the status of a parish church, a status which it had up till then never possessed, but which it retained even after reinstatement of the archdiocese in 1821 until very recently) and leaving him in control only of the Duchy of Westphalia, as well as of the Prince-Bishopric of Münster. His reign was to prove a short one - in the reorganisation of the Holy Roman Empire as provided by its law of 1803 (at the time of writing still nameless) enacting the so-called Reichsdeputationshauptschluss (Recès principal de la délégation extraordinaire d'Empire, Hauptschluß der außerordentlichen Reichsdeputation, "chief recommendation of the select committee of the Reichstag"), the archiepiscopal electorates of Cologne and Trier were abolished and Anton's remaining territories secularised, Münster being partitioned between the Prussians and various minor princes and Westphalia claimed by the Landgrave of Hesse-Darmstadt.

Anton Victor became Grand Master of the Teutonic Order in 1804. The order's German lands, centred on Mergentheim, were secularised in 1809, but Anton remained its Grand Master until his death. Between 1816 and 1818 he was Viceroy of the Kingdom of Lombardy–Venetia.

== Ancestry ==
Ancestors of Archduke Anton Victor of Austria

8. Leopold, Duke of Lorraine
4. Francis I, Holy Roman Emperor
9. Élisabeth Charlotte of Orléans
2. Leopold II, Holy Roman Emperor
10. Charles VI, Holy Roman Emperor
5. Maria Theresa of Austria
11. Elisabeth Christine of Brunswick
1. Archduke Anton Victor of Austria
12. Philip V of Spain
6. Charles III of Spain
13. Elisabeth Farnese
3. Maria Luisa of Spain
14. Augustus III of Poland
7. Maria Amalia of Saxony
15. Maria Josepha of Austria

Archduke Anton Victor of Austria House of Habsburg Born: 31 August 1779 in Florence Died: 2 April 1835 in Vienna
Regnal titles
| Preceded by Maximilian Francis of Austria | Duke of Westphalia; 1801–1803 | Annexation; 1802 to Hesse-Darmstadt; 1814 to Prussian Westphalia |
Catholic Church titles
Regnal titles
| Preceded by Maximilian Francis of Austria | Prince-Bishop of Münster^{1} 1801–1803 | Vacant Title next held by Ferdinand von Lüninck(former) Prince-Bishop of Corvey^{2} as Bishop of Münster |
| Preceded by Maximilian Francis of Austria | Archbishop and Elector of Cologne^{3} 1801–1803 | Vacant Title next held by Ferdinand August von Spiegel^{4} as Archbishop of Cologne |
| Preceded by Charles Louis of Austria | Grand Master of the Teutonic Order; 1804–1835 | Succeeded by Maximilian of Austria-Este |
Notes and references
1. Reign over the Prince-Bishopric of Münster was questionable (but not illegal, he was only administrator like others in past, because he was elected by the Cathedral chapter but not confirmed by the Pope), and also barred by Prussian occupation from 1802; 2. The no longer princely bishopric of Münster was annexed by Prussia in 1814; 1803–20 sede vacante, it was subsequently void of regnal power and the bishop's title was simply Bishop.; 3. Reign over the Electorate of Cologne was questionable (but not illegal because he was elected by the Cathedral chapter but not confirmed by the Pope), he was not a priest but anyway a cleric, and barred by the partially French (from 1795) and partially Hessian occupation (from 1802), formally the Archdiocese of Cologne being abolished after the Concordat of 1801 and its territory given to the new Diocese of Aachen; 4. The territory of the former Electorate of Cologne, this latter abolished by the still nameless law of 1803, was ceded to Prussia by the Congress of Vienna in 1814; the archiepiscopal see as re-established in 1821 was of course void of regnal power and Archbishop von Spiegel's title was, like that of his successors, simply Archbishop. The practice of elevating Archbishops of Cologne to the cardinalate came only later.
