= Friedrich Wilhelm von Schmettau =

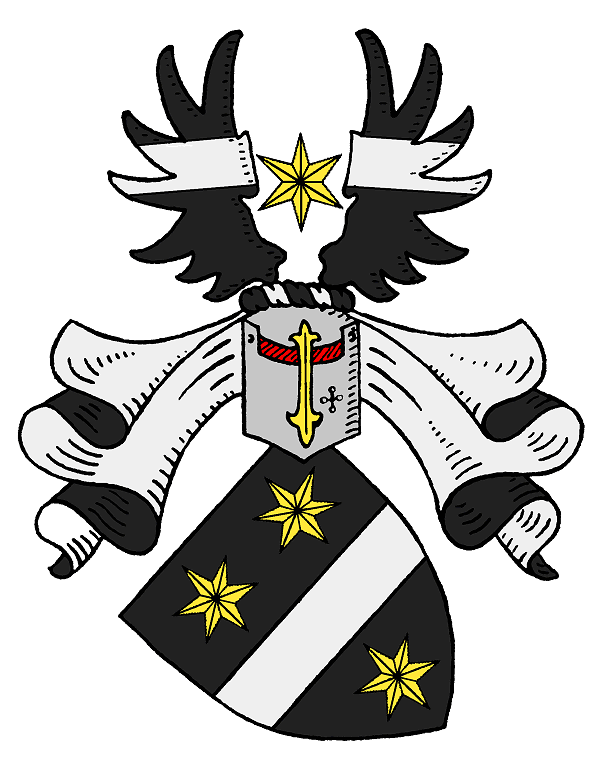
Schmettau family crest

Friedrich Wilhelm Karl Graf von Schmettau (April 13, 1743 – October 18, 1806) was a Prussian lieutenant general, cartographer, topographer, and nobleman. He was the son of Field Marshal Samuel von Schmettau, who also bore the title of "Graf" or "Count". He was killed during the Battle of Auerstedt, due to wounds he sustained while leading the Prussian Army into battle against the Grand Armee under Marshall Davout.

== Early life ==
He began his military career during the Seven Years War and served throughout the duration of the war, including the Battle of Leuthen which Frederick the Great considered to be his greatest triumph. After the end of the war Schmettau remained a Prussian officer and rose through the ranks, becoming a first lieutenant after the war and entering a temporary retirement as a major in 1778.

== Retirement ==
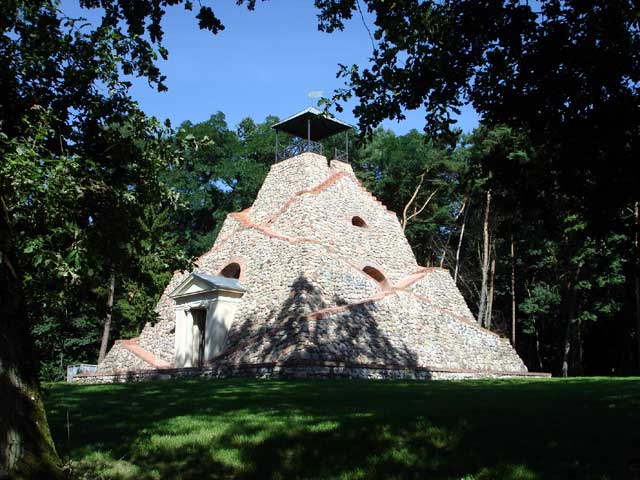
Garzau pyramid

During his temporary retirement, Schmettau worked as a cartographer and topographer just as his father had and created some of the highest-quality maps of the Prussian realm at the time. He was described as a pioneer of modern cartography. Schmettau also found himself entangled in a famous legal scandal during the reign of Frederick II, better known as Frederick the Great, where one of his tenants had refused to pay rent after local carp-ponds had cut off the stream to his mill-wheel. The local courts and even the high court of the Prussian state ruled in Schmettau's favor, due to his noble status, only for Frederick himself to personally rule in favor of the tenant and imprison the corrupt jurors. Schmettau had also constructed a pyramid in Garzau after purchasing the estate in 1779, it still stands today and is the largest fieldstone pyramid in Germany.

== Brief return and Napoleonic Wars ==
Schmettau made a brief return to military service in 1787 now under the rank of colonel, and was tasked by the new king Frederick Wilhelm II with mapping the Silesian Mountains. He left the service again just 3 years later in 1790, and was denied re-entry into the military after the War of the First Coalition began in 1792.

He was later allowed to return to the military in 1797 after the succession to the throne of Frederick Wilhelm III, now promoted to the rank of major general and a highly-decorated general for his time. He was awarded the prestigious Swedish Order of the Sword in 1798 followed by a promotion to lieutenant general the next year, and in 1805 he was awarded the second highest military honor in Prussia when he received the Order of the Red Eagle.

In the lead-up to the War of the Fourth Coalition, which would decide the fate of the Holy Roman Empire Schmettau was placed on the Prussian General Staff.

=== Battle of Auerstedt ===
During the twin battles of Jena and Auerstedt, Schmettau had led the Prussian forces under the Duke of Brunswick to an attack on the district of Hassenhausen. This was in an attempt to dislodge the French forces under Marshall Davout, who had not expected to encounter such a large Prussian Army and aimed to mount a cautious defense. The attack at Hassenhausen was a failure, and both the Duke of Brunswick as well as Schmettau were fatally wounded in action. Both the battles of Jena and Auerstedt would be crushing Prussian defeats, leading to the later dissolution of the Holy Roman Empire and the creation of the Confederation of the Rhine, though Schmettau would not live to see this. He was able to retreat to the city of Weimar where he died shortly after, he was then buried at the Jacobsfriedhof Cemetery. He was 63.
