= Adelheid Amalie Gallitzin =

German salonist (1748–1806)

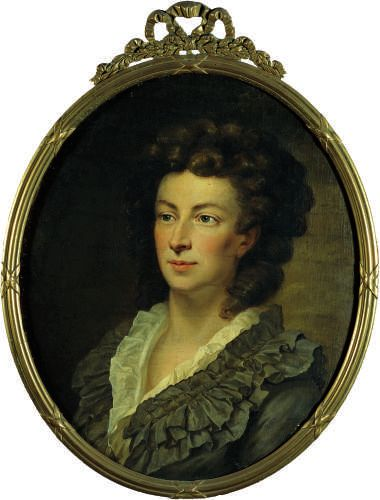
Princess Adelheid Amalie Gallitzin

Princess Adelheid Amalie Gallitzin (also known as Amalia Samuilovna Golitsyna; Russian: Амалия Самуиловна Голицына; 28 August 1748 – 27 April 1806) was a German salonist. She was the daughter of the Prussian field marshal, Count Samuel von Schmettau, and the mother of Prince Demetrius Augustine Gallitzin.

== Early life ==
Countess Adelheid Amalia von Schmettau was born in Berlin on 28 August 1748, the daughter of Prussian Field Marshal Count Samuel von Schmettau (1684-1751) and his second wife Maria Johanna von Ruffer (1717-1771). Her father died when she was very young, and at the age of four or five, her mother placed her in an Ursuline convent school in Breslau. She was brought back home to Berlin at the age of nine, and taught by private tutors. At the age of fourteen or fifteen she attended a French finishing academy in the city for two years.

After leaving finishing school, Amalie was introduced into society and invited to become one of the maids of honor to Margravine Elisabeth Louise of Brandenburg-Schwedt, wife of Prince Ferdinand, brother of Frederick the Great. In 1768 while on an excursion with Princess Ferdinand and other ladies of court to the spa at Aachen, that she met Prince Dimitri Gallitzin. Prince Gallitzin was returning to Saint Petersburg, having completed fourteen years serving as Catherine the Great's ambassador to France.

== Princess Gallitzin ==
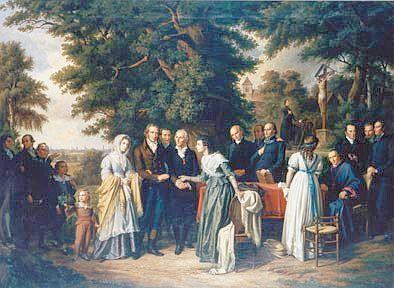
Princess Gallitzin in the circle of her friends

On 28 August 1768, her twentieth birthday, she married the Prince in a chapel at Aix-la-Chapelle. The couple proceeded to Saint Petersburg, where her husband was given a posting as Imperial Ambassador to the Dutch Republic. On the way to The Hague, they stopped in Berlin, where her daughter Princess Marianna was born on 7 December 1769. The family stayed there some time before continuing to The Hague, where on 22 December 1770, her son Prince Demetri was born.

At the age of 24 she forsook society suddenly and devoted herself to the education of her children. She applied herself to the study of mathematics, classical philology, and philosophy under Frans Hemsterhuis, who kindled her enthusiasm for Socratic-Platonic idealism, and later under the name of "Diokles" dedicated to her the "Diotima", his Lettres sur l'atheisme. Although a professing Catholic, she was a great admirer of Diderot.

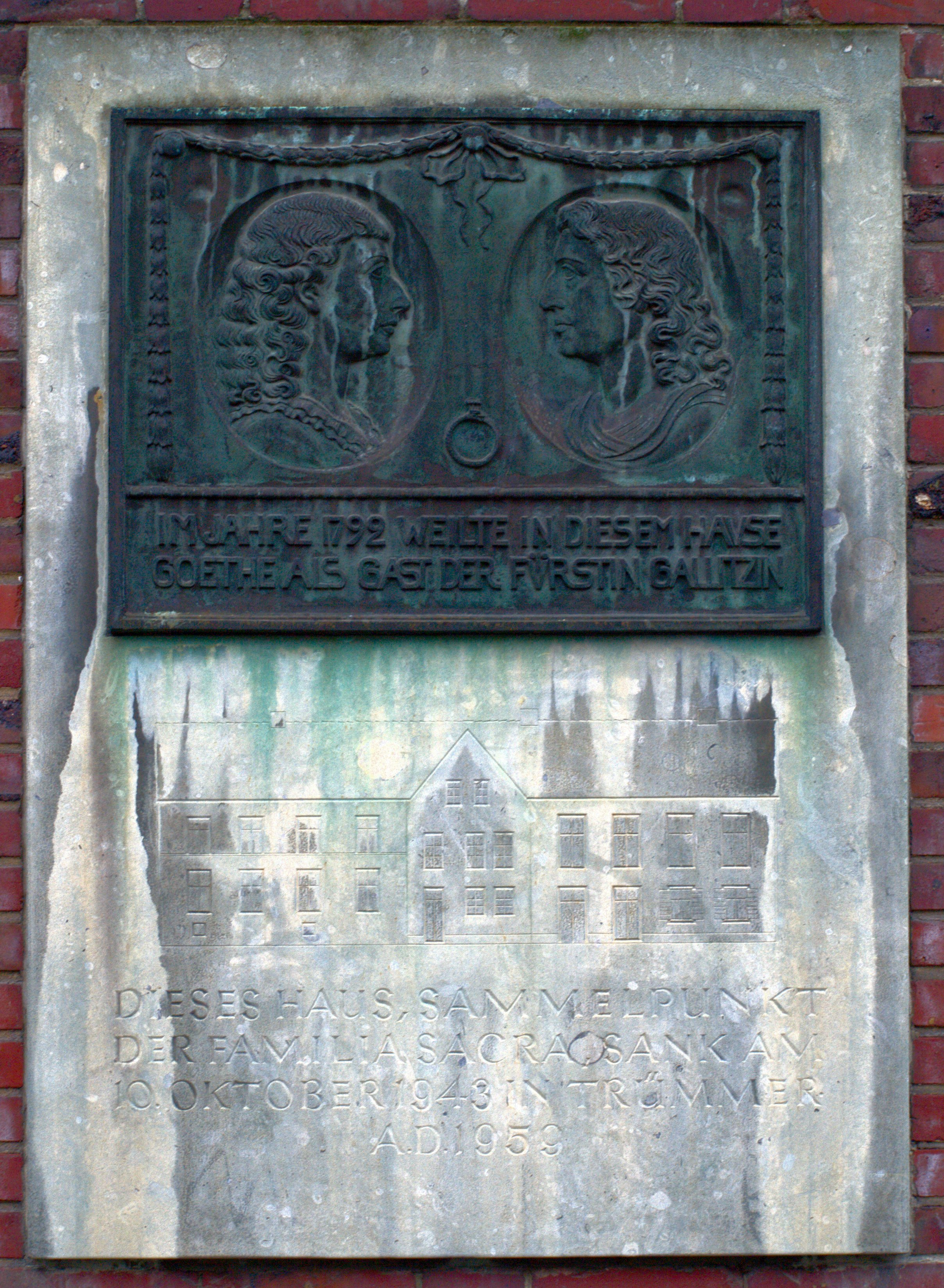
Bronze commemorative plaque for Goethe's meeting with Princess Gallizin at the Annette-von-Droste-Hülshoff-Gymnasium in Münster

The educational reform introduced by Franz Friedrich Wilhelm von Fürstenberg, Vicar-General of Münster, induced her to take up her residence in the Westphalian capital. She was able to gather around her, at Münster, a mystical-literary cenacle which had a considerable influence on German intellectual and religious life at the time. Here she soon became the centre of a set of intellectual men led by Fürstenberg. This circle also included the gymnasial teachers (whom she incited to the deeper study of Plato), Bernhard Heinrich Overberg, the reformer of popular school education, Clemens August von Droste-Vischering, Count Leopold zu Stolberg, and the philosopher Johann Georg Hamann, who was interred in her garden. The poet Matthias Claudius of the "Wandsbecker Bote" was also a familiar visitor, and Johann Wolfgang Goethe said that his hours in this circle were among his most pleasant recollections.

A severe illness in 1786 led her to the reading of the Christian Bible, and her return to religion. On 28 August 1786, at the insistence of Overberg, she approached the confessional for the first time in many years. Soon afterwards, she made Overberg her chaplain. Under his influence, she underwent a complete change which affected all her surroundings. Her religious life took on a larger importance. She became the centre of the Roman Catholic religious and literary revival in Münster. In those revolutionary times, she provided for the spread of Christian writings, proved a support for the religious faith of many of her friends, and persuaded others, among them Count Stolberg, to make their peace with the Catholic Church in Germany. In 1797 Johann Theodor Katerkamp joined her household as a private tutor.

She was known for gentle charity, particularly towards refugee priests, intellectuals, and members of the French nobility fleeing from the French Revolution and the Reign of Terror.

Portions of her correspondence and diaries were published by Scheuter (Münster, 1874–76) in three parts. She was the mother of the well-known American missionary Prince Demetrius Gallitzin. She died in Angelmodde.
