= Prince-Bishopric of Münster =

State of the Holy Roman Empire (1180–1802)

Prince-Bishopric of Münster Episcopatus Monasteriensis (Latin) Hochstift Münster (German)
- 1180–1802
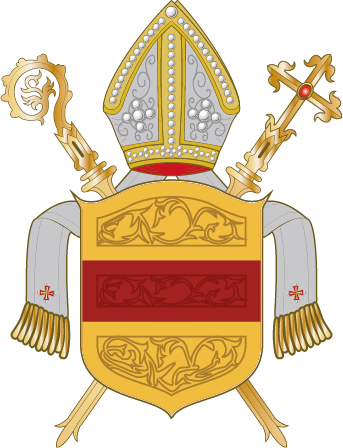
- Flag (1770–1802) Coat of arms

- Map of part of the Lower Rhenish–Westphalian Circle in 1560, Prince-Bishopric of Münster highlighted in red
- Status: Prince-Bishopric
- Capital: Münster in Westphalia
- Common languages: Low Saxon, German, Frisian
- Religion: Catholic
- Government: Ecclesiastical principality
- Historical era: Middle Ages
  - Created on collapse of Saxony: 1180
  - Secularised to Prussia: 1802
Preceded by
Duchy of Saxony
Succeeded by
Arenberg
Duchy of Oldenburg
Kingdom of Prussia
Principality of Salm

The Prince-Bishopric of Münster (German: Fürstbistum Münster, Bistum Münster or Hochstift Münster) was a large ecclesiastical principality in the Holy Roman Empire, located in the northern part of today's North Rhine-Westphalia and western Lower Saxony. From the sixteenth to the eighteenth centuries, it was often held in personal union with one or more of the nearby ecclesiastical principalities of Cologne, Paderborn, Osnabrück, Hildesheim, and Liège.

Münster was bordered by the United Provinces to the west, by Cleves, Vest Recklinghausen, and Mark in the south, Paderborn and Osnabrück in the east. In the north and north-east it bordered East Frisia, Oldenburg and the Electorate of Hanover (est. 1692).

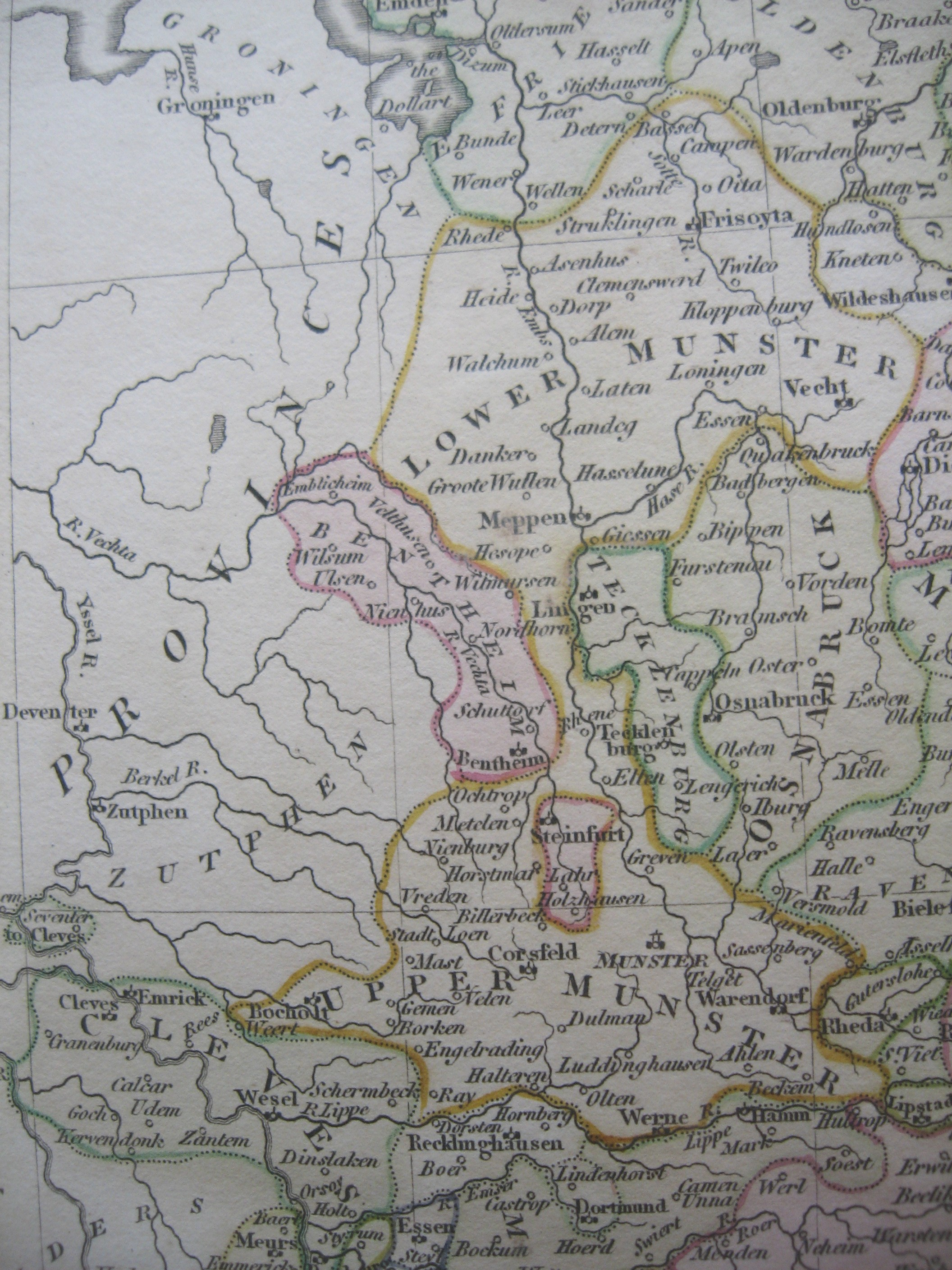
Münster and surrounding area on the eve of the French Revolution

As with all the other prince-bishoprics of the Holy Roman Empire, it is important to distinguish between the Prince-Bishopric of Münster and the Diocese of Münster although both entities were ruled by the same individual. The dioceses were generally larger than the corresponding prince-bishoprics and in the parts that extended beyond the prince-bishopric, the prince-bishop's authority was strictly that of an ordinary bishop and limited to spiritual matters.

== History ==
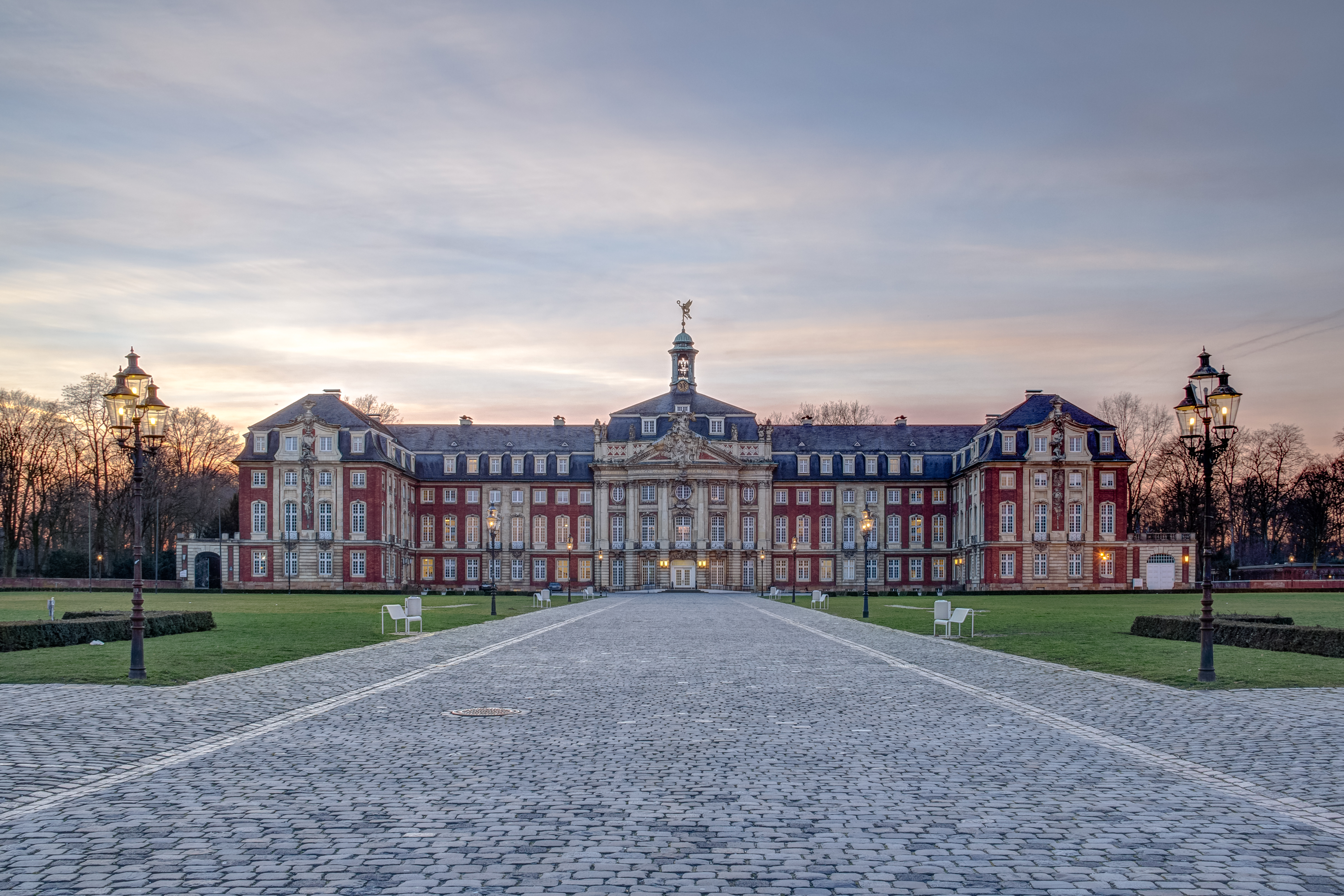
Prince-Bishops' Palace in Münster

The Diocese of Münster was founded by Charlemagne towards the end of the Saxon Wars about 795, as a suffragan of Cologne. He gave three large landed estates. These lands, at least in part, lay within the area of the later city. They were called the Brockhof, owned by the cathedral chapter; the Kampwordeshof, belonged later to the collegiate church of St. Moritz; and the Bispinghof belonged to the bishop.

The first bishop was Ludger, who, since the year 787, had been a zealous missionary in five Frisian "hundreds", or districts. As Mimigernaford had been designated the centre of the new district, Ludger built a monastery for canons regular there, from which the place took the name of Münster. Here he lived with his monks according to the rule of Saint Chrodegang of Metz, which in 789 had been made obligatory in the Frankish territories.

The territory of the Diocese of Münster was bounded on the west, south, and north-west by the dioceses of Cologne and Utrecht, on the east and north-east by Osnabrück. The diocese also included districts remote from the bulk of its territory, namely, the five Frisian hundreds on the lower Ems (Hugmerki, Hunusgau, Fivelgau, Federitgau, and Emsgau).

=== Territorial evolution ===
Most of the territory over which the bishop eventually exercised sovereign rights lay north of the River Lippe, extending as far as the upper Ems and the Teutoburg Forest. The most important accession was in 1252, when the see purchased the Countship of Vechta. The country between these new districts was acquired later: in 1403 the district about Cloppenburg and Oyte was gained, in 1406 the manorial domain of Ahaus and the castle of Stromberg with its jurisdiction; and in 1429 Wildeshausen in pledge from the Prince-Archbishopric of Bremen, renewed by its successor Swedish Bremen-Verden by the Treaty of Nijmegen on 19 March 1679. According to the latter Prince-Bishop Ferdinand II, Baron of Fürstenberg granted Sweden a loan amounting to 100,000 riksdalers in return for the renewed pledge. This last addition made the new territory, which was entirely separate from the southern part of the bishopric, a compact body subsequently known as "the lower bishopric"; it remained an integral part of the Bishopric of Münster until the Reformation, which somewhat reduced its size. What was left was retained until the secularization.

=== From bishop to prince-bishop ===
The 12th century was marked by a considerable growth of the bishops' secular power. In 1173 the right of administering the city passed to the bishop and the cathedral chapter. Bishop Ludwig I, Count of Tecklenburg (1169–73), restored to the see the temporal jurisdiction over its domains previously exercised by the Counts of Tecklenburg. Hermann II, like his immediate predecessors, Frederick II, Count of Are (1152–68), and Ludwig I, was a partisan of Frederick Barbarossa. With the overthrow of Henry the Lion, Duke of Saxony, the last obstacle in the way of the complete sovereignty of the bishops was removed, and Hermann appears as a great feudatory of the empire. During the episcopate of his second successor, Dietrich III of Isenberg-Altena (1218–26), the position of the bishop as a prince of the empire was formally acknowledged in 1220 by Frederick II. Hermann II was the last bishop directly appointed by the emperor. Dissensions arose about the election of his successor, Otto I, Count of Oldenburg (1204–18), and Emperor Otto IV decreed that thenceforward the cathedral chapter alone should elect the bishop. The See of Cologne retained the right of confirmation, and the emperor that of investiture. The bishop's temporal authority was limited in important matters; particularly in taxation, the consent of representative bodies of his subjects was necessary. Among these, the cathedral chapter appears early in the 13th century; later, the lower nobility, and, lastly, the city of Münster. In course of time the cathedral chapter extended its rights by agreements made with bishops before election.

The temporal power of the see increased greatly during the episcopate of Bishop Otto II, Count of Lippe (1247–59). The city, at the same time, struggled to become independent of the bishop, but was not entirely successful, despite its alliance with the cathedral chapter. In 1252 Countess Jutta von Vechta-Ravensberg sold Meppen to the Bishop of Münster.

Even as early as the eleventh century the bishops all belonged to noble families, generally to those possessing lands in the neighbourhood; only too often the bishopric was administered for the benefit rather of the bishop's family than of the Church. The bishops were, in consequence, frequently involved in the quarrels of the nobility; ecclesiastical affairs were neglected and the prosperity of the inhabitants of the prince-bishopric suffered. Conditions were at their worst during what is known as the Münster Diocesan Feud (1450–57). The arbitrary conduct of Bishop Henry II of Moers (1424–50) had aroused a very bitter feeling in the city. After his death the majority of the cathedral chapter elected Walram of Moers, brother of Henry and also Archbishop of Cologne, while the city and a minority of the chapter demanded the election of Eric of Hoya, brother of Count John of Hoya. Although the election of Walram was confirmed by the pope, open war for the possession of the see broke out, and Walram was unable to gain possession of the city of Münster. In 1457, after his death, a compact was made by which Eric of Hoya received a life income, and the privileges of the city were confirmed, while both parties recognized the new bishop appointed by the pope, John II, Count Palatine of Simmern (1457–66).

=== Protestant Reformation ===
Under Frederick III (1522–32), brother of the Archbishop of Cologne, Hermann of Wied, Lutheranism spread rapidly after 1524, especially in the city. Scarcely any opposition to the innovation was made by the next bishop, Franz von Waldeck (1532–53), who from the first planned to aid the Reformation in his three prince-bishoprics of Münster, Minden, and Osnabrück, in order to form out of these three a secular principality for himself. He was obliged, indeed, for the sake of his endangered authority, to proceed against the Anabaptists in the city of Münster; but he did little for the restoration of the Faith, and at last joined the Schmalkaldic League. William of Ketteler (1553–57) was more Protestant than Catholic: although he regarded himself as an administrator of the old Church, and took the Tridentine oath, he refused to comply with the demands of Rome, and resigned in 1557.

Bishop John William of Cleves (1574–85), inherited the Duchy of Cleves in 1575, married, and gave up the administration of the bishopric. A long diplomatic battle as to his successor arose between the Catholic and Protestant powers, during which the bishopric was administered by Cleves. The maintenance of Catholicism in the bishopric was assured by the victory of Ernst of Bavaria (1585–1612), who was also Bishop of Freising, Hildesheim, and Liège, and Archbishop of Cologne. He zealously undertook the Counter-Reformation, invited the Jesuits to aid him, and encouraged the founding of monasteries of the old orders, although he could not repair all the losses. The western part of the Frisian district under the ecclesiastical jurisdiction of Münster was transferred, in 1569, to the newly founded bishoprics of Groningen and Deventer, and with them fell into Protestantism. In the same way the possessions of the Counts of Bentheim-Steinfurt and some other fortified towns passed from the ecclesiastical jurisdiction of the bishop.

Christoph Bernhard von Galen (1650–78) was equally efficient both as bishop and as secular ruler; he forced the refractory city of Münster, after a long siege, to acknowledge his sovereign rights, succeeded in freeing his territory from foreign troops, gained parts of the Prince-Archbishopric of Bremen and of the Prince-Bishopric of Verden in a war with Sweden (taking part in the Bremen-Verden Campaign), restored church discipline, and established a school system for his territory. He attacked the Dutch Republic in the Franco-Dutch War.

=== The Eighteenth Century and the French Revolutionary Wars ===
Bishop Clemens August of Bavaria (1719–61) was also Elector of Cologne, and Bishop of Paderborn, Hildesheim, and Osnabrück. During his rule, the bishopric suffered heavily during the War of the Polish Succession and the Seven Years' War. His successor, Maximilian Frederick of Königsegg-Rothenfels (1761–84), who was also Elector of Cologne, mostly left the administration of Münster to a young cathedral canon, Franz Friedrich Wilhelm von Fürstenberg, during whose administration the principality attained unparalleled prosperity. However, at the election of an auxiliary bishop, von Fürstenberg was defeated by Maximilian Franz of Austria, who later succeeded to both the sees of Münster and Cologne (1784–1801). Maximilian Franz fled Bonn in 1794 at the arrival of French revolutionary troops, who were to remain in permanent occupation of the part of the bishopric located on the left bank of the Rhine. He spent the rest of his life in Vienna, although still nominally the prince-bishop of Münster. Upon his death, his nephew, Archduke Anton Victor of Austria, succeeded him. He was the last Elector of Cologne and Prince-Bishop of Münster. A secret agreement between France and Prussia on 5 August 1796 had chosen the Prince-Bishopric as the Prussian compensation for the territories on the left bank of the Rhine lost to France.

=== End of the Prince-Bishopric of Münster ===
In 1803 the bishopric, with c. 310,000 inhabitants was secularized by the Reichsdeputationshauptschluss and broken up into numerous parts. The larger Eastern share was assigned to Prussia, which took possession in March 1803. Oldenburg gained the Northern part (Vechta and Cloppenburg). The other parts were given as compensation to former rulers of territories west of the Rhine: Arenberg, Looz-Corswarem, Salm and Croÿ. Within the following years all parts became French.

In 1815 Prussia was given the southern part (Oberstift) and the Kingdom of Hanover most of the north (Niederstift), with Oldenburg keeping its acquisitions.

== Bishops and, from 1180, Prince-Bishops ==
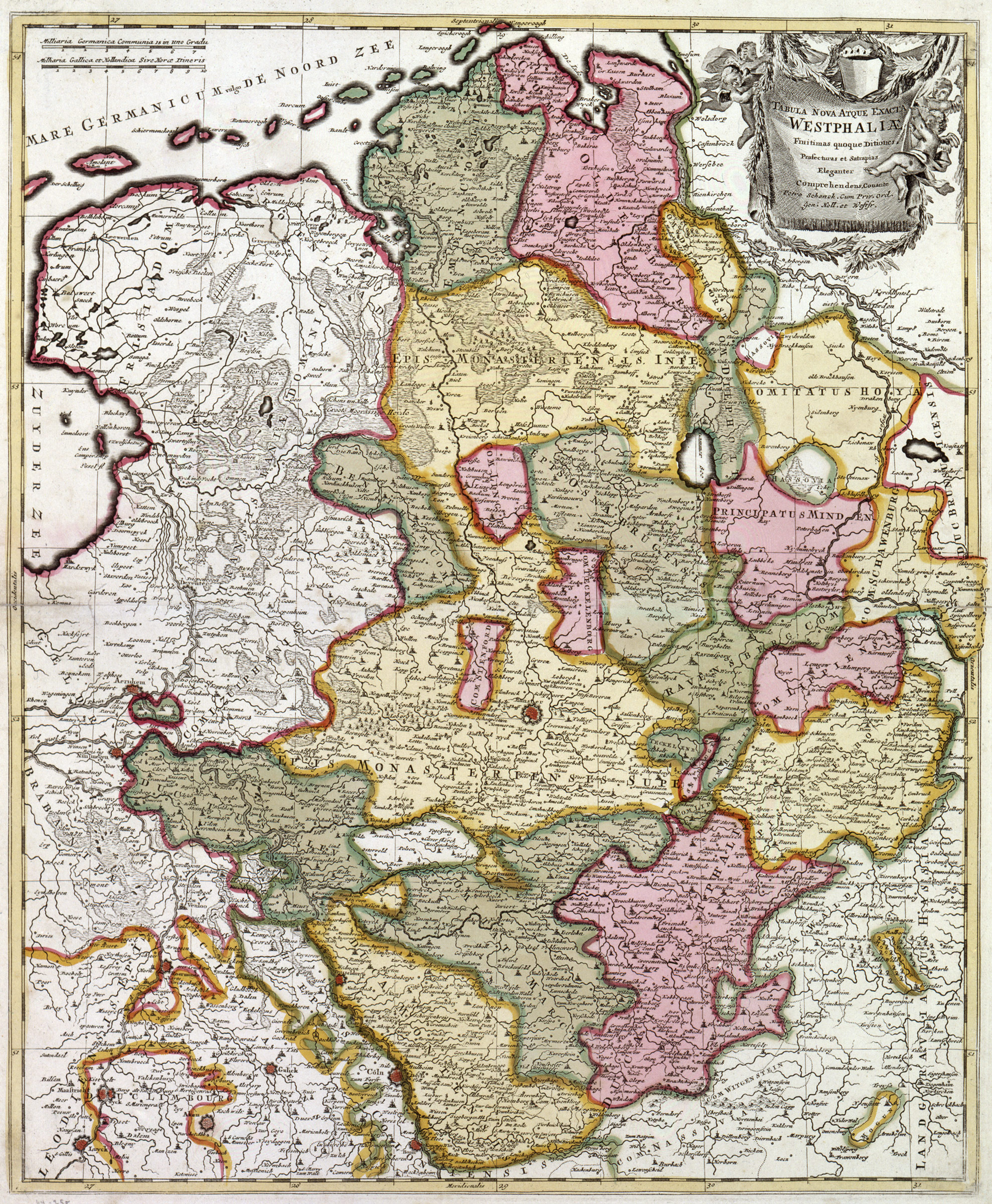
1710 map of the Lower Rhenish–Westphalian Circle by German cartographer Peter Schenk the Elder (1660–1719). The Prince-Bishopric of Münster is the central yellow territory.

Bishops and Prince-Bishops of Münster
Name	From	To
Ludger	805	809
Gerfried	809	839
Altfried	839	849
Liutbert	849	871
Berthold	872	875
Wolfhelm	875	900
Nidhard	900	922
Rumhold	922	941
Hildbold	942	967
Dodo	967	993
Swidger	993	1011
Dietrich I	1011	1022
Siegfried of Walbeck	1022	1032
Hermann I	1032	1042
Rudbert	1042	1063
Frederick I	1064	1084
Erpho	1084	1097
Burchard of Holte	1098	1118
Dietrich II of Winzenburg	1118	1127
Egbert	1127	1132
Werner of Steußlingen	1132	1151
Frederick II of Are	1152	1168
Ludwig I of Wippra	1169	1173
Hermann II of Katzenelnbogen	1173	1202
Otto I of Oldenburg	1203	1218
Dietrich of Isenberg	1219	1226
Ludolf of Holte	1226	1247
Otto II of Lippe	1247	1259
Wilhelm I of Holte	1259	1260
Gerhard of the March	1261	1272
Everhard of Diest	1275	1301
Otto III of Rietberg	1301	1306
Conrad I of Berg	1306	1310
Ludwig II of Hesse	1310	1357
Adolf III of the March	1357	1363
John I of Virneburg	1363	1364
Florence of Wevelinghoven	1364	1378
Potho of Pothenstein	1379	11 October 1382
Heidenreich Wolf of Lüdinghausen	1382	9 April 1392
Otto IV of Hoya	11 April 1392	3 October 1424
Henry II of Moers	31 October 1424	2 June 1450
Walram of Moers	15 July 1450	3 October 1456
Eric I of Hoya	15 July 1450	23 October 1457
John of Pfalz-Simmern	9 April 1457	February 1466
Henry III of Schwarzburg	7 December 1466	24 December 1496
Conrad II of Rietberg	1497	9 February 1508
Eric II of Saxe-Lauenburg	24 February 1508	20 October 1522
Frederick III of Wied	6 November 1522	22 March 1532
Eric of Brunswick-Grubenhagen	26 March 1532	14 May 1532
Francis von Waldeck	1 June 1532	15 July 1553
William of Ketteler	21 July 1553	2 December 1557
Bernhard of Raesfeld	4 December 1557	25 October 1566
John II of Hoya	28 October 1566	5 April 1574
John William, Duke of Jülich-Cleves-Berg	28 April 1574	8 May 1585
Ernest of Bavaria	18 May 1585	17 January 1612
Ferdinand I of Bavaria	12 April 1612	13 September 1650
Bernhard von Galen	4 November 1650	19 September 1678
Ferdinand II of Fürstenberg	1 November 1678	26 June 1683
Maximilian Henry of Bavaria	11 September 1683	3 June 1688
Frederick Christian of Plettenberg	29 July 1688	5 May 1706
Francis Arnold von Wolff-Metternich zur Gracht	30 August 1706	25 December 1718
Clemens August I of Bavaria	26 March 1719	6 February 1761
Maximilian Frederick of Königsegg-Rothenfels	7 April 1761	15 April 1784
Archduke Maximilian Franz of Austria	15 April 1784	27 July 1801
Archduke Anton Victor of Austria	9 September 1801	25 February 1803

== See also ==
- Schloss Nordkirchen
