= Archduke Maximilian Francis of Austria =

Archbishop-Elector of Cologne (1756–1801)

Archduke Maximilian Francis
- Archbishop-Elector of Cologne
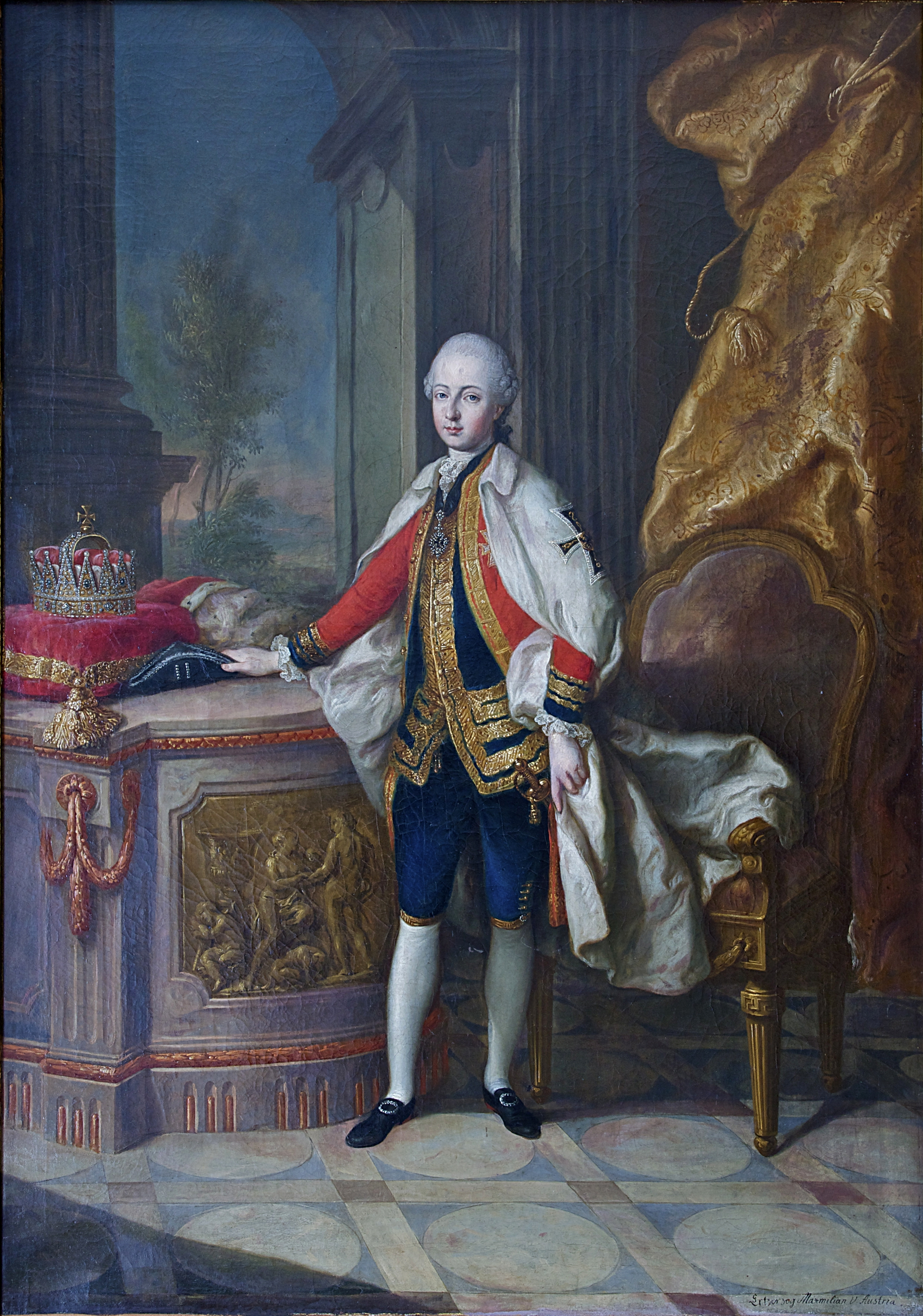
- Portrait by Anton von Maron
- Born: 8 December 1756; Hofburg Imperial Palace, Vienna, Archduchy of Austria, Holy Roman Empire
- Died: 27 July 1801 (aged 44); Hetzendorf Palace, Vienna, Archduchy of Austria, Holy Roman Empire
- Burial: Imperial Crypt, Vienna
Names
- English: Maximilian Francis Xavier Joseph John Anthony; German: Maximilian Franz Xaver Josef Johann Anton
- House: Habsburg-Lorraine
- Father: Francis I, Holy Roman Emperor
- Mother: Maria Theresa
- Religion: Roman Catholic

Archduke Maximilian Francis of Austria (Maximilian Franz Xaver Joseph Johann Anton de Paula Wenzel; 8 December 1756 – 27 July 1801) was Elector of Cologne and Grand Master of the Teutonic Knights from 1780 until his death. Influenced by Enlightenment ideals, he sought to implement reforms in various political fields. During the First Coalition War, his territories on the left bank of the Rhine were occupied and later annexed by France. He was the youngest child of Holy Roman Empress Maria Theresa and Francis I, Holy Roman Emperor. He was the last fully functioning Elector of Cologne and the second employer and patron of the young Ludwig van Beethoven.

== Biography ==
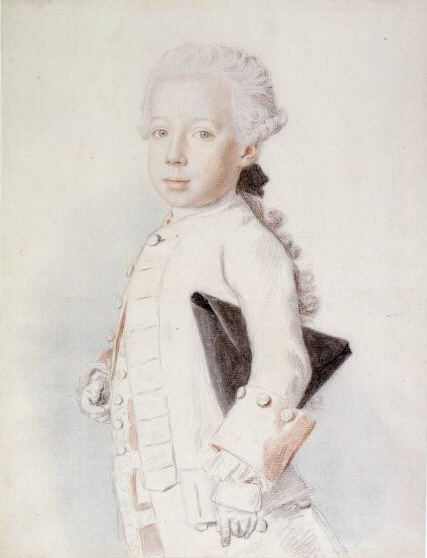
Maximilian Franz at the age of 6 in 1762 by Liotard

Maximilian Francis was born on 8 December 1756, his father's 48th birthday, in the Hofburg Palace, Vienna. He was the fifth son and youngest child of Francis I, Holy Roman Emperor, and his wife, Empress Maria Theresa. In 1780, he succeeded his uncle Prince Charles Alexander of Lorraine as Hochmeister (Grand Master) of the Deutscher Orden (Teutonic Knights).

On February 1775, Archduke Maximilian Francis paid a visit to his sister, Marie Antoinette. But when he arrived at the French Court he did not go by the name of Archduke Maximilian Franz, rather the pseudonym, the Comte de Burgau. In 1784, he became Archbishop and Elector of Cologne, living in the Electoral Palace, Bonn. He remained in that office until his death in exile. In his capacity as Arch-chancellor of the Holy Roman Empire for Italy and as the Pope's deputy he crowned as emperor in Frankfurt first his brother Leopold II in 1790, and in 1792 his nephew Francis II.

At the same time as he became elector of Cologne, Maximilian Francis was elected to the related Bishopric of Münster and held court in Bonn, as the Archbishop-Electors of Cologne had done since the late Middle Ages. A keen patron of music, Maximilian Francis maintained a court musical establishment in which Beethoven's father was a tenor. Thus he played an important role in the son's early career as a member of the same musical body of which his grandfather, also named Ludwig van Beethoven, had been Kapellmeister.

The court organist, Christian Gottlob Neefe, was Beethoven's early mentor and teacher. Recognising his young pupil's gift both as a performer and as a composer, Neefe brought Beethoven to the court, advising Maximilian Francis to appoint him as assistant organist. Maximilian Francis, too, recognised the extraordinary abilities of the young Beethoven. In 1787, he gave Beethoven leave to visit Vienna to become a pupil of Mozart, but the visit was cut short by news of the last illness of Beethoven's mother, and evidence for any contact with Mozart is lacking.

In 1792, the Redoute was opened, making Godesberg a spa town. Beethoven played in the orchestra. After a concert given there in the presence of Joseph Haydn, another visit for studies in Vienna was planned. Beethoven went on full salary to Vienna to study with Haydn, Antonio Salieri and others. The elector maintained an interest in the young Beethoven's progress, and several reports from Haydn to Maximilian detailing it are extant. The prince anticipated that Beethoven would return to Bonn and continue working for him, but due to the subsequent political and military situation his subject never returned, choosing to pursue a career in Vienna.

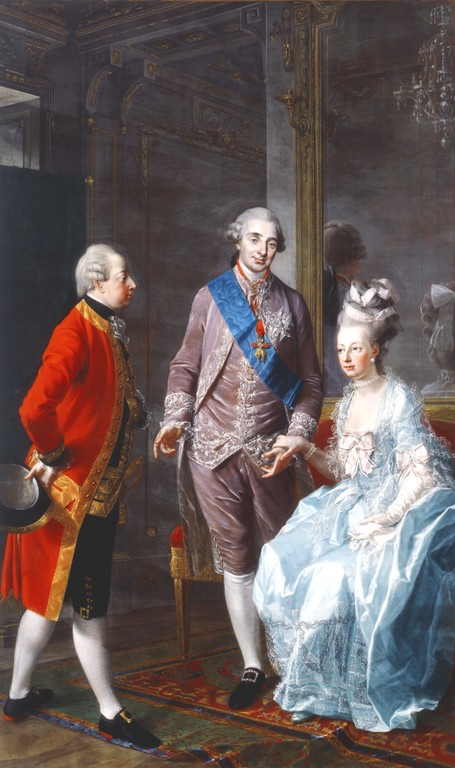
Maximilian Francis visits with his sister Marie Antoinette and King Louis XVI of France. Painting by Josef Hauzinger

Maximilian Francis's rule over most of the electorate ended in 1794, when his domains were overrun by the troops of Revolutionary France. During the French Revolutionary Wars, Cologne and Bonn were both occupied by the French Revolutionary Army in the second half of 1794. As the French approached, Maximilian Francis left Bonn, as it turned out never to return, and his territories on the left bank of the Rhine eventually passed to France under the terms of the Treaty of Lunéville (1801). The Archbishop's court ceased to exist. Although Maximilian Francis still retained his territories on the right bank of the Rhine, including Münster and the Duchy of Westphalia, the elector, grossly corpulent and plagued by ill health, took up residence in Vienna after the loss of his capital and remained there until his death at the age of 44, at Hetzendorf Palace in 1801. The dismantling of the court made Beethoven's relocation to Vienna permanent, and his stipend was terminated.

Beethoven planned to dedicate his First Symphony to his former patron, but the latter died before it was completed.

The Electorate of Cologne was secularised in the course of the German mediatisation of 1802–1803.

== Ancestry ==
Ancestors of Archduke Maximilian Francis of Austria

8. Charles V, Duke of Lorraine
4. Leopold, Duke of Lorraine
9. Eleonore of Austria
2. Francis I, Holy Roman Emperor
10. Philippe I, Duke of Orléans
5. Élisabeth Charlotte of Orléans
11. Elizabeth Charlotte of the Palatinate
1. Archduke Maximilian Francis of Austria
12. Leopold I, Holy Roman Emperor
6. Charles VI, Holy Roman Emperor
13. Eleonore Magdalene of Neuburg
3. Maria Theresa of Austria
14. Louis Rudolph, Duke of Brunswick-Wolfenbüttel
7. Elisabeth Christine of Brunswick-Wolfenbüttel
15. Christine Louise of Oettingen-Oettingen

Archduke Maximilian Francis of Austria House of Habsburg-Lorraine Born: 8 December 1756 in Vienna Died: 27 July 1801 in Hetzendorf
Catholic Church titles
Regnal titles
Preceded by Maximilian Friedrich von Königsegg-Rothenfels	Archbishop-Elector of Cologne; Duke of Westphalia; Prince-Bishop of Münster; 1784–1801	Succeeded by Archduke Anton Victor of Austria
Preceded by Prince Charles Alexander of Lorraine	Grand Master of the Teutonic Order; 1780–1801	Succeeded by Archduke Charles, Duke of Teschen
