= Samuel von Schmettau =

Prussian field marshal (1864–1751)

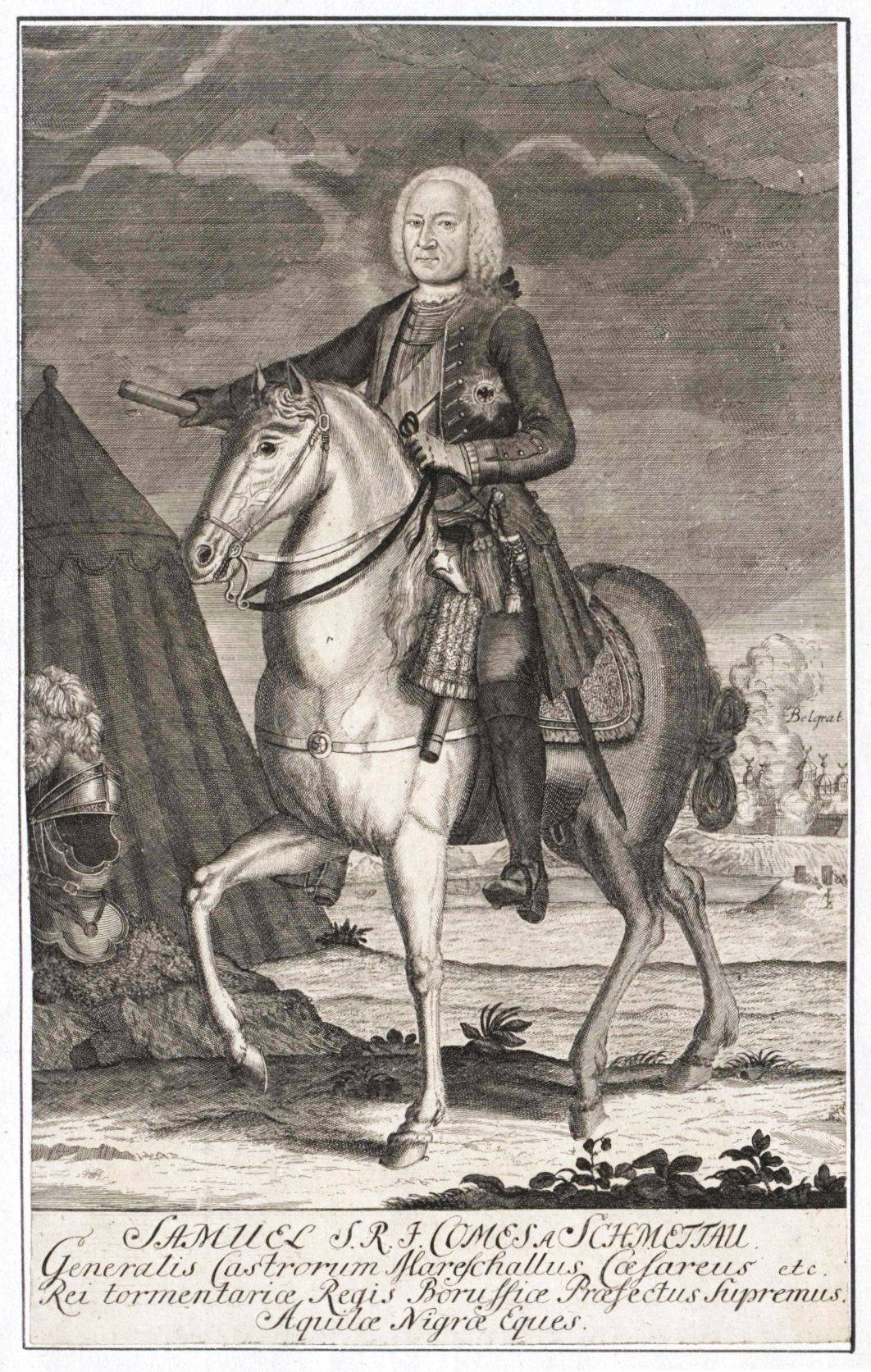
Samuel Graf von Schmettau

Samuel Graf von Schmettau (24 March 1684 – 18 August 1751) was a Prussian field marshal, artilleryman, and cartographer.

== Life ==
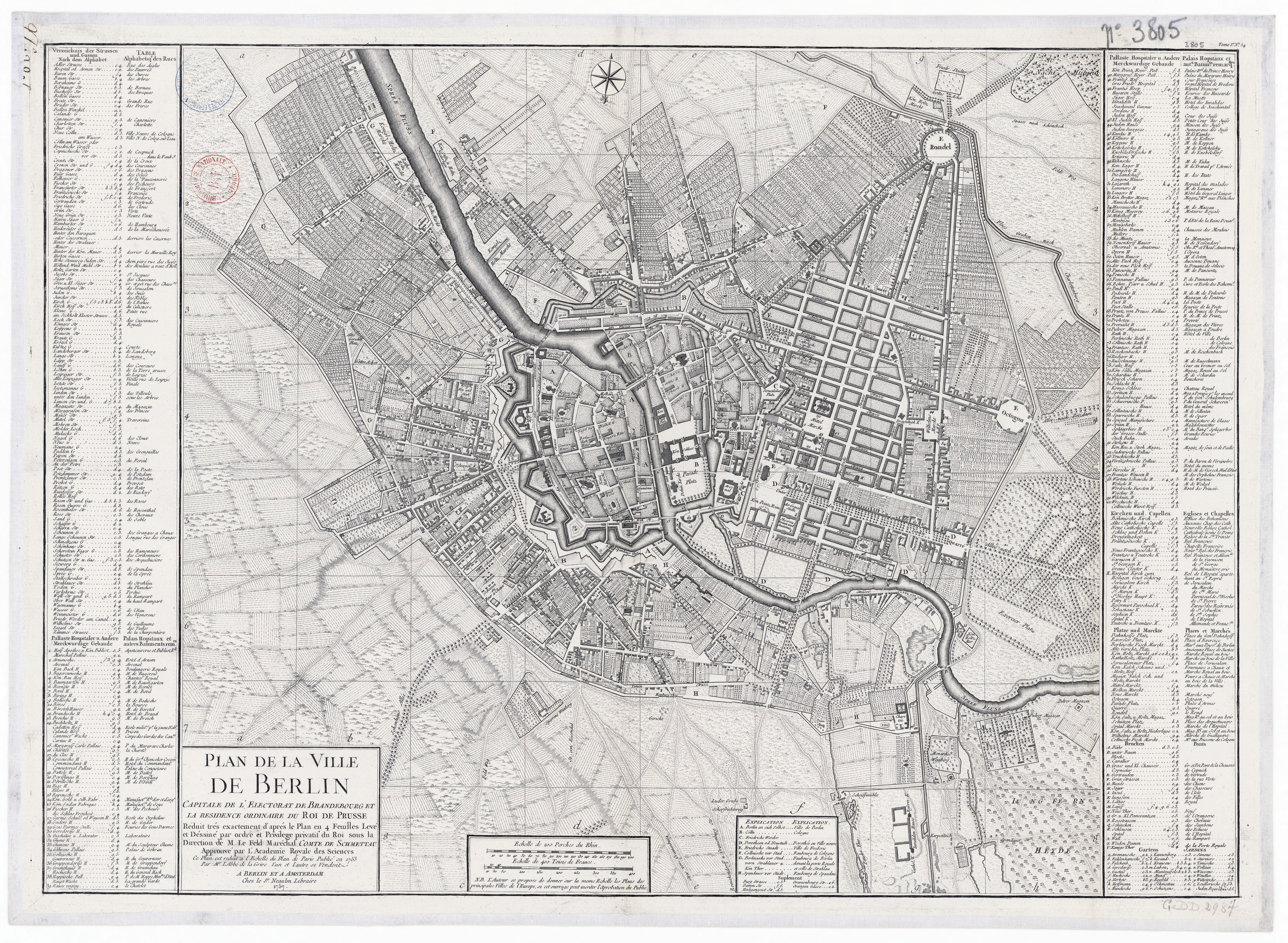
Schmettau's map of Berlin (1748)

Von Schmettau was born in Berlin. His mother, Marie de la Fontaine, belonged to a Huguenot family. His father died in 1707, as Royal Prussian secretary to the ambassador in London. In 1699, he joined the military and served under numerous flags during his career. He started as a Danish Cuirassier, under the command of his uncle William. In 1703, he joined the Margrave of Anspach Dragoons, as a lieutenant, where another uncle, Gottlieb Schmettau, was chief. Schmettau experienced his baptism of fire at the Battle of Blenheim. A little later, he became captain and company commander, and was promoted to major in 1707, and lieutenant colonel in 1708. He was adjutant general of the Prince of Hesse, at the Battle of Malplaquet.

In 1714, Schmettau went with his regiment in the Electorate of Saxony. On 22 October 1716, he was promoted to colonel in the artillery. He went into the service of the Habsburgs on 7 April 1717. There Schmettau took part in the conquest of Belgrade. On 22 March 1719, he was field general, and came to Sicily as quartermaster general. His achievements as an artilleryman and fortress builder impressed the emperor and Prince Eugene of Savoy. In 1720, during the War of the Quadruple Alliance, he led the Capture of Messina (1719), and in 1732 with Corsica, he led the campaign against Sardinia and France.

On 27 October 1733, he was promoted to lieutenant field marshal. He commanded the O'Gilvy Infantry Regiment (No. 46); with his regiment, he then took part in the War of the Polish Succession. In the years 1737–1739, during Russo-Austrian-Turkish War, he was governor of Timișoara. Unhappy not to be given command of the field army, Schmettau attempted to defect to Venice, but this failed. Although he was promoted to imperial field marshal on 19 March 1741, he continued to pursue his intention to find a new employer. He was welcomed into the Prussian Army on 12 June 1741. Schmettau immediately became Prussian field marshal without having previously led any troops in Prussia. On 18 January 1742, Schmettau was awarded the Order of the Black Eagle. He left the service in 1742.

== Diplomacy ==
In the following years, he represented Prussia under the emperor Charles VII. As ambassador to Paris, he prepared for the second Silesian war. Schmettau was a curator of the Academy of Sciences. He continued his education as a cartographer and created the first good map of Berlin in 1748, and in 1751 of East Friesland. In his "Memoires Secrets", he described his experiences.

== Family ==
He married Marie Charlotte von Boyen (died 1739); they had two children. He married Marie Johanna von Ruffer, who bore him three children:

- Friedrich Wilhelm Carl von Schmettau (1743–1806), Lieutenant General and important cartographer,
- Adelheid Amalie Gallitzin (1748–1806), mother of Demetrius Augustine Gallitzin.
