= Maximilian Friedrich von Königsegg-Rothenfels =

- Archbishop of Cologne
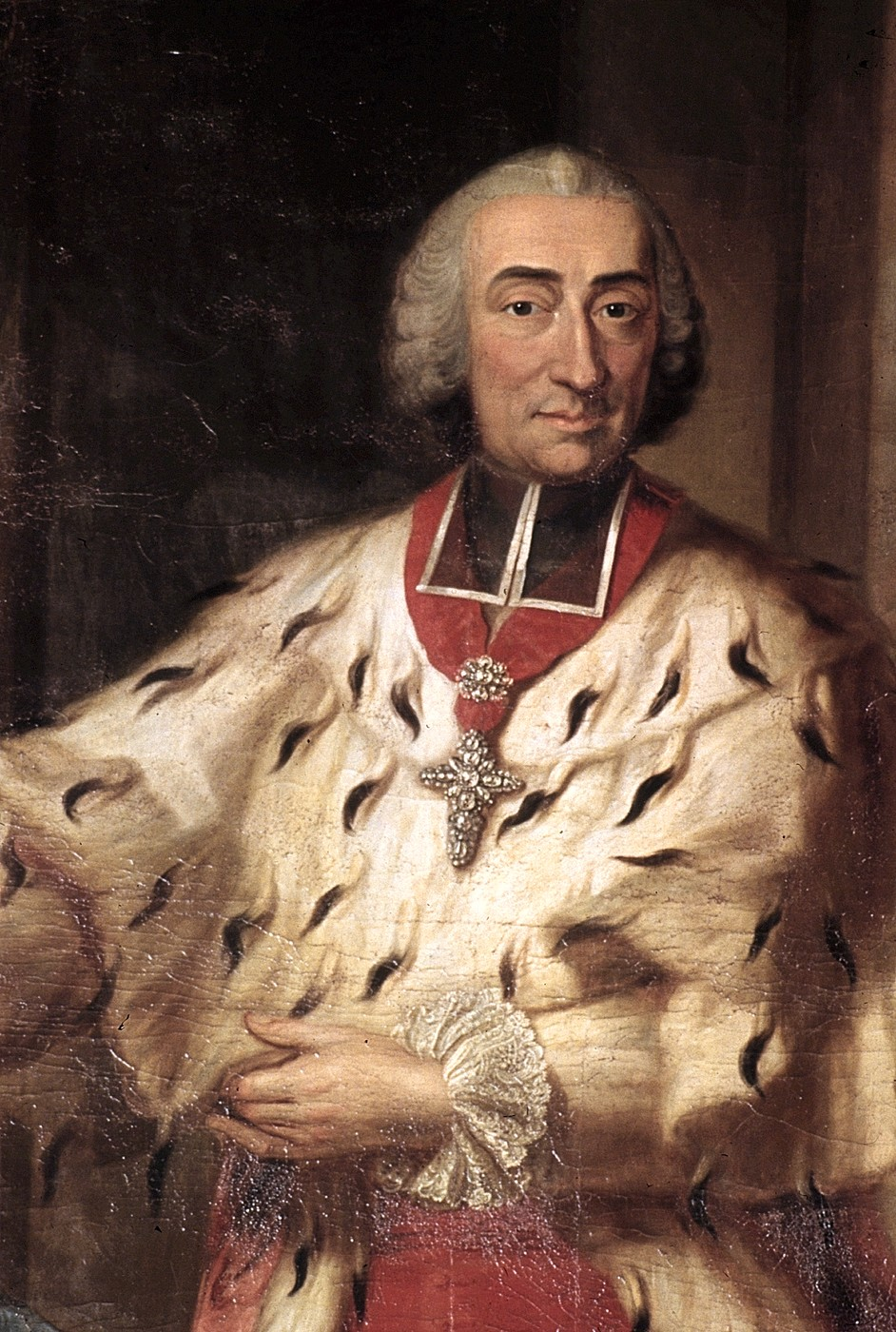
- Church: Roman Catholic Church
- Archdiocese: Cologne
- See: Cologne
- Appointed: 1761
- Term ended: 1784
- Predecessor: Clemens August of Bavaria
- Successor: Maximilian Francis of Austria

Orders
- Ordination: 28 March 1756
- Consecration: 16 August 1761 by Cesare Alberico Lucini

Personal details
- Born: 13 May 1708 Cologne, Holy Roman Empire
- Died: 15 April 1784 (aged 75)

Maximilian Friedrich von Königsegg-Rothenfels (13 May 1708 – 15 April 1784) was the Archbishop-Elector of Cologne and the Bishop of Münster from 1761 to 1784.

He was born in Cologne, son of Count Albert-Eusebius-Franz von Königsegg-Rothenfels and his wife Countess Maria von Manderscheid-Blankenheim. He was the first Elector of Cologne to come from outside the Bavarian Wittelsbach dynasty since 1583.

He was the first employer and patron of the young Ludwig van Beethoven, who at age twelve composed Three Early Piano Sonatas, WoO 47 in his honor. These works, known as the "Kurfürstensonaten" ("Prince-Elector sonatas") in German, were not assigned an opus number by Beethoven and are not included in the "canonical" count of 32 piano sonatas, which begins with Op. 2 No. 1 in F minor and ends with Op. 111 in C minor.

== See also ==
- Königsegg-Rothenfels

Catholic Church titles
Regnal titles
| Preceded by Clemens August I of Bavaria | Archbishop-Elector of Cologne and Duke of Westphalia; 1761–1784 | Succeeded by Maximilian Francis of Austria |
| Preceded by Clemens August I of Bavaria | Prince-Bishop of Münster; 1761–1784 | Succeeded by Maximilian Francis of Austria |
