= François Hemsterhuis =

Dutch writer on aesthetics and moral philosophy

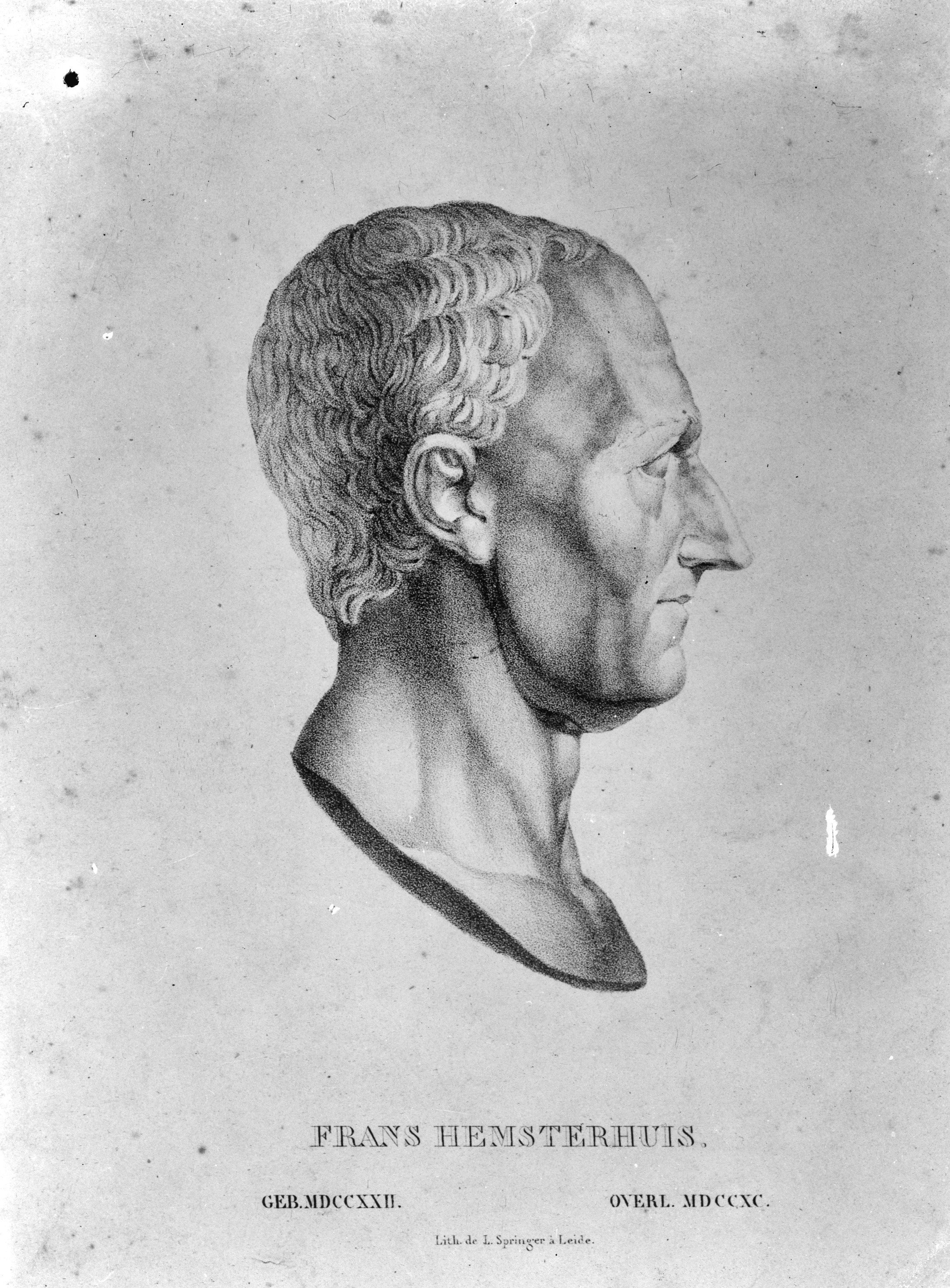

François Hemsterhuis (also Frans Hemsterhuis; 27 December 1721 – 7 July 1790) was a Dutch writer on aesthetics and moral philosophy.

== Biography ==
The son of Tiberius Hemsterhuis, he was born at Franeker in the Netherlands. He was educated at the University of Leiden, where he studied Plato. Failing to obtain a professorship, he entered the service of the state, and for many years acted as secretary to the state council of the United Provinces. He died at the Hague on 7 July 1790. Through his philosophical writings he became acquainted with many distinguished persons—Goethe, Herder, Princess Adelheid Amalie Gallitzin, and especially Jacobi, with whom he had much in common. His most valuable contributions are in the department of aesthetics or the general analysis of feeling. His philosophy has been characterized as Socratic in content and Platonic in form. Its foundation was the desire for self-knowledge and truth, untrammelled by the rigid bonds of any particular system.

== Works ==
His most important works, all of which were written in French, are:

- Lettre sur la sculpture (1769), in which occurs the well-known definition of the Beautiful as "that which gives us the greatest number of ideas in the shortest space of time"
- its continuation, Lettre sur les désirs (1770)
- Lettre sur l'homme et ses rapports (1772), in which the "moral organ" and the theory of knowledge are discussed
- Sophyle (1778), a dialogue on the relation between the soul and the body, and also an attack on materialism
- Aristée (1779), the "theodicy" of Hemsterhuis, discussing the existence of God and his relation to man
- Simon (1787), on the four faculties of the soul, which are the will, the imagination, the moral principle (which is both passive and active)
- Alexis (1787), an attempt to prove that there are three golden ages, the last being the life beyond the grave
- Lettre sur l'athéisme (1787).

A collected edition of his works was made by P. S. Meijboom (1846-1850); see also S. A. Gronemann, F. Hemsterhuis, de Nederlandische Wijsgeer (Utrecht, 1867); E. Grucker, François Hemsterhuis, sa vie et ses œuvres (Paris, 1866); E. Meyer, Der Philosoph Franz Hemsterhuis (Breslau, 1893), with bibliographical notice; Augustinus P. Dierick, "Pre-Romantic Elements in the aesthetic and moral writings of François Hemsterhuis (1721-1790)." Studies in Eighteenth Century Culture 26 (1998), 247–271. A bilingual French-Dutch edition was published, introduced and commented on by Michael John Petry in 2001, titled Wijsgerige werken – Frans Hemsterhuis.
