= St. Peter's Church, Cologne =

Church in Cologne

Coordinates: 50°57′20″N 6°55′01″E

- Jesuit Church of Saint Peter, Cologne
- Kirche der Jesuiten Sankt Peter, Köln
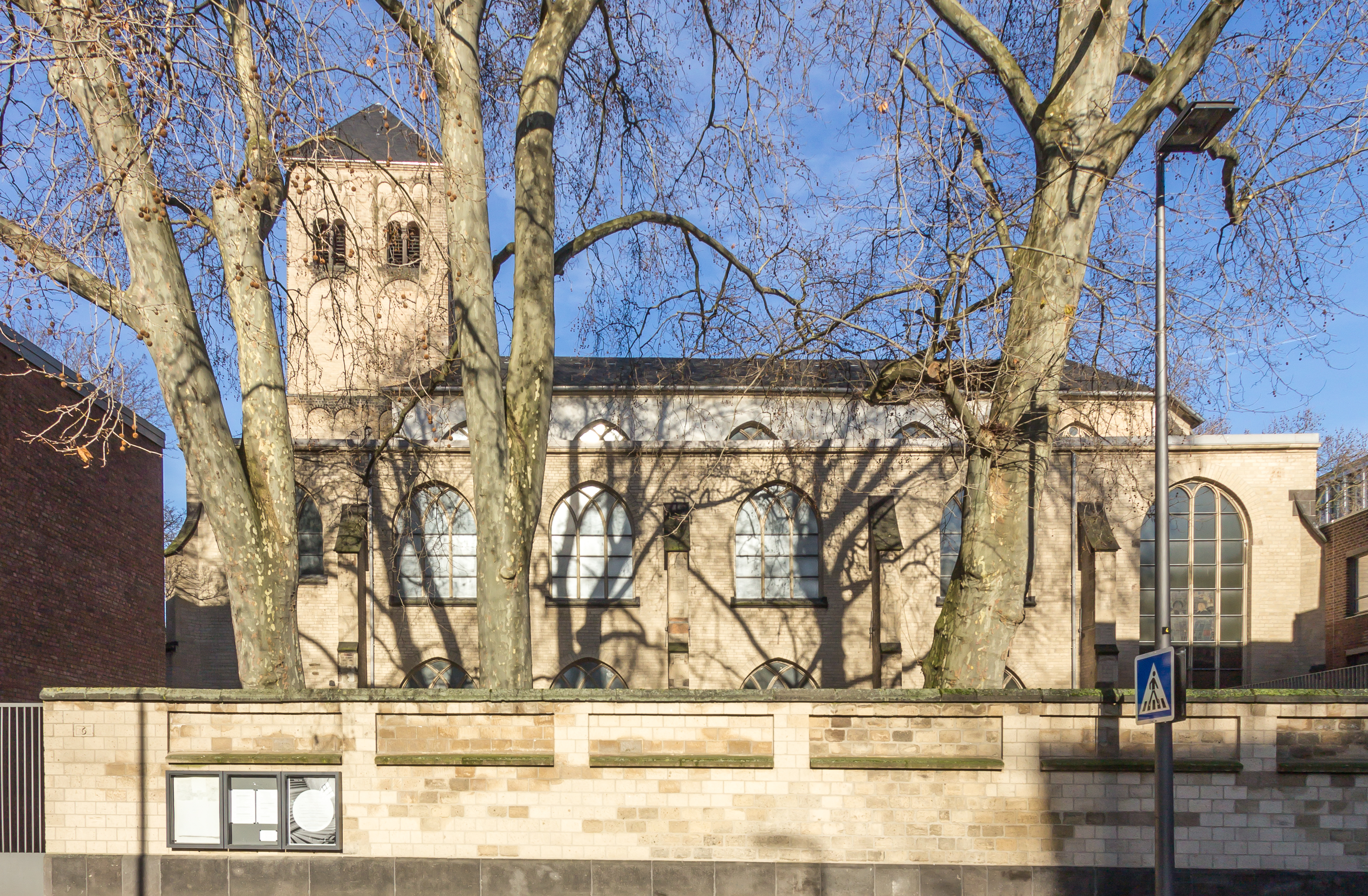
- St. Peter's Church, Cologne
- Location: Altstadt-Süd, Cologne, North Rhine-Westphalia
- Country: Germany
- Denomination: Roman Catholic
- Religious institute: Society of Jesus
- Website: www.sankt-peter-koeln.de

History
- Status: Parish church, Collegiate church
- Dedication: Peter the Apostle

Architecture
- Functional status: active
- Heritage designation: Kulturdenkmal
- Architectural type: Basilica, Double chapel
- Style: Gothic
- Years built: 1513–1525, rebuilt 1950–1961
- Groundbreaking: 1513
- Completed: 1525
- Demolished: 29 June 1943

St. Peter's Church (Sankt Peter) is a Roman Catholic church in Cologne, run by the Jesuits. The painter Rubens was baptised in the church and his father was later buried there. Rubens' Crucifixion of St. Peter is on display in the church. It was commissioned in 1638 by the Cologne art collector and businessman Eberhard Jabach and was hung in the church in 1642 after Rubens'death. The building also houses the 'Kunst-Station Sankt Peter', a centre for contemporary art, music, and literature.

== History ==
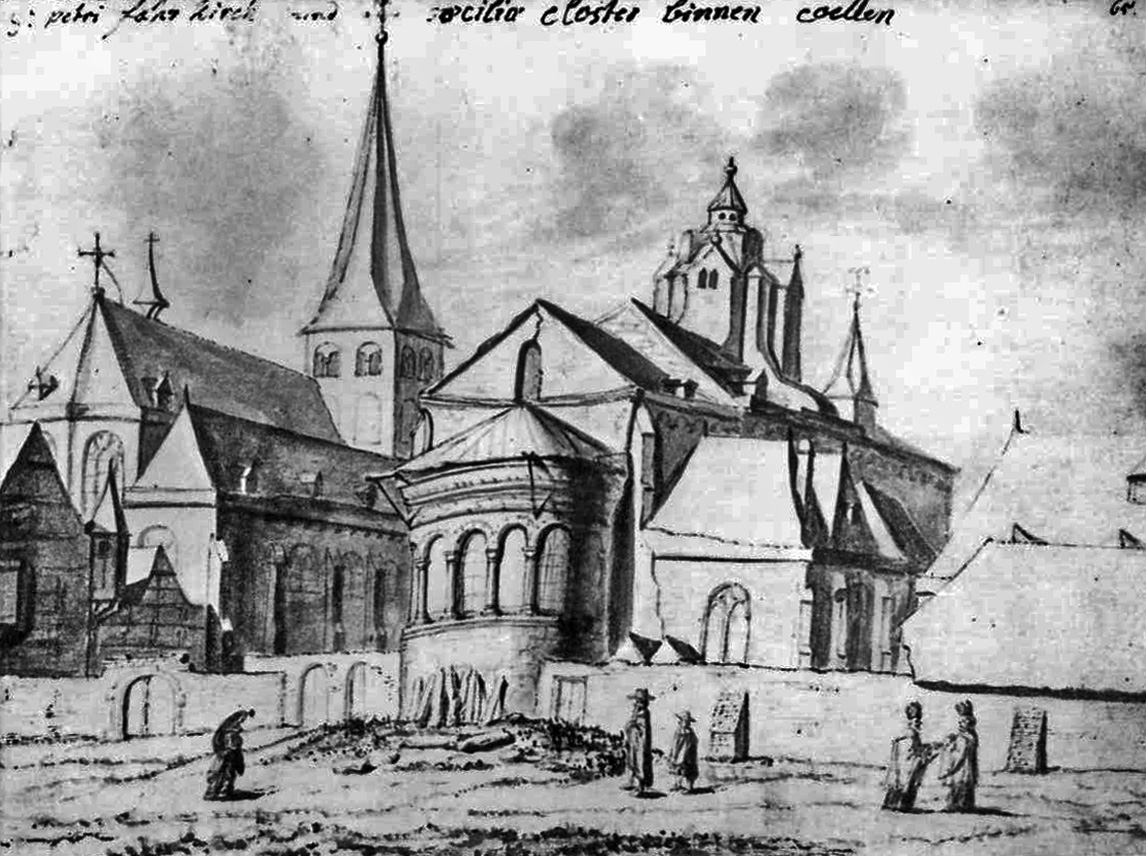
St. Peter and St. Cäcilien in 1665

The church was constructed in the Gothic style between 1513 and 1525 (501 years ago) on the remains of earlier Roman and Romanesque churches. It is the latest surviving Gothic church in the city. It is maintained and supported by the Förderverein Romanische Kirchen Köln.

The surviving Romanesque west tower dates to 1170. It and the nearby Cäcilienkirche are the city's only two surviving double-churches, which combined a parish church with a collegiate church or Stiftkirche.

== Destruction and restoration ==
In the night bombing raid on 29 June 1943, known as the "Peter-und-Paul-Angriffs" (Peter and Paul attack), the church's parish was almost completely destroyed, with the church building itself leveled to its foundations and its pillars destroyed. Efforts were made to secure the more important pieces of church furniture such as the stained glass and altarpieces, but much of the opulent woodwork such as the altars, pulpits and 1907 organ in its 1820 case were lost to the fire.

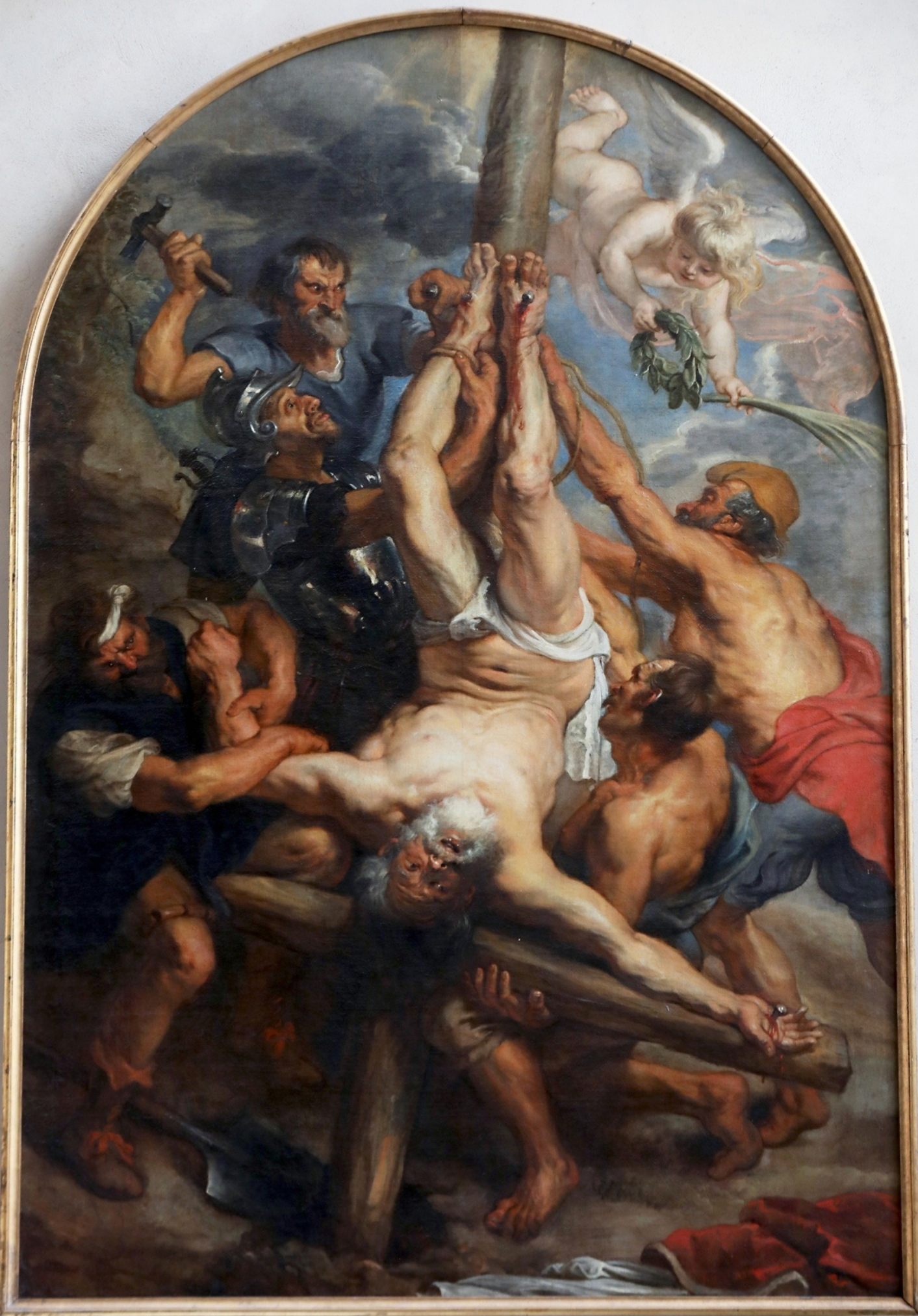
Rubens, The Crucifixion of St. Peter

Initial measures were put in place to make the site safe in 1950 and the rest of the restoration was almost complete by 1960, led by government architects Karl Band and Wilhelm Schorn. With few resources and a prevailing consensus to emphasize what had been lost, Band's restoration was "sensitive, but ultimately [left the interior] only as a fragment", producing an almost Protestant effect compared to its pre-war appearance. A redbrick nave contrasted with a raised bluestone chancel, while a new dark wood coffered ceiling was added – the city conservator Hiltrud Kier remarked that the ceiling's effect "was similar to a coffin lid". She also stated that the new vaulted ceilings between the clerestory windows were "like architectural tears" reminiscent of the lost vaulting. Only a few restored or reconstructed furnishings were placed in the building, including the medieval font and the wrought iron Baroque grille.

In July 1960 the Jesuits took over the church and in September of that year one of them, Alois Schuh, was made the parish priest. A new, simple stone high-altar was later added and in 1961 the altarpieces by Cornelius Schut (The Conversion of St. Peter) and Rubens returned to the church; and the surviving stained glass windows were reinstalled. The building was restored again between 1997 and 2000 to designs by Wiegmann & Trübenbach.

== Gallery ==
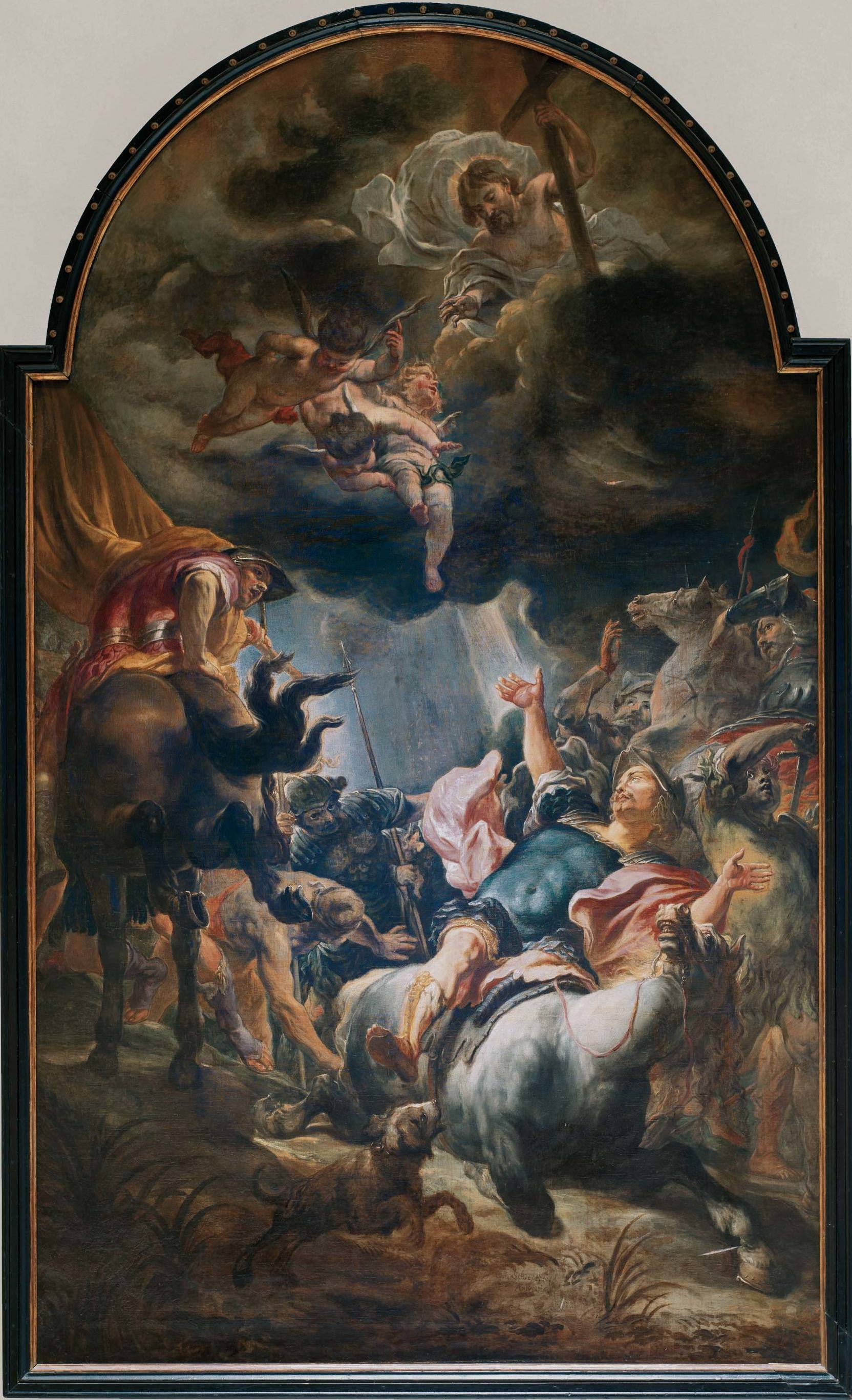
Cornelis Schut, Conversion of Saint Paul (1644)

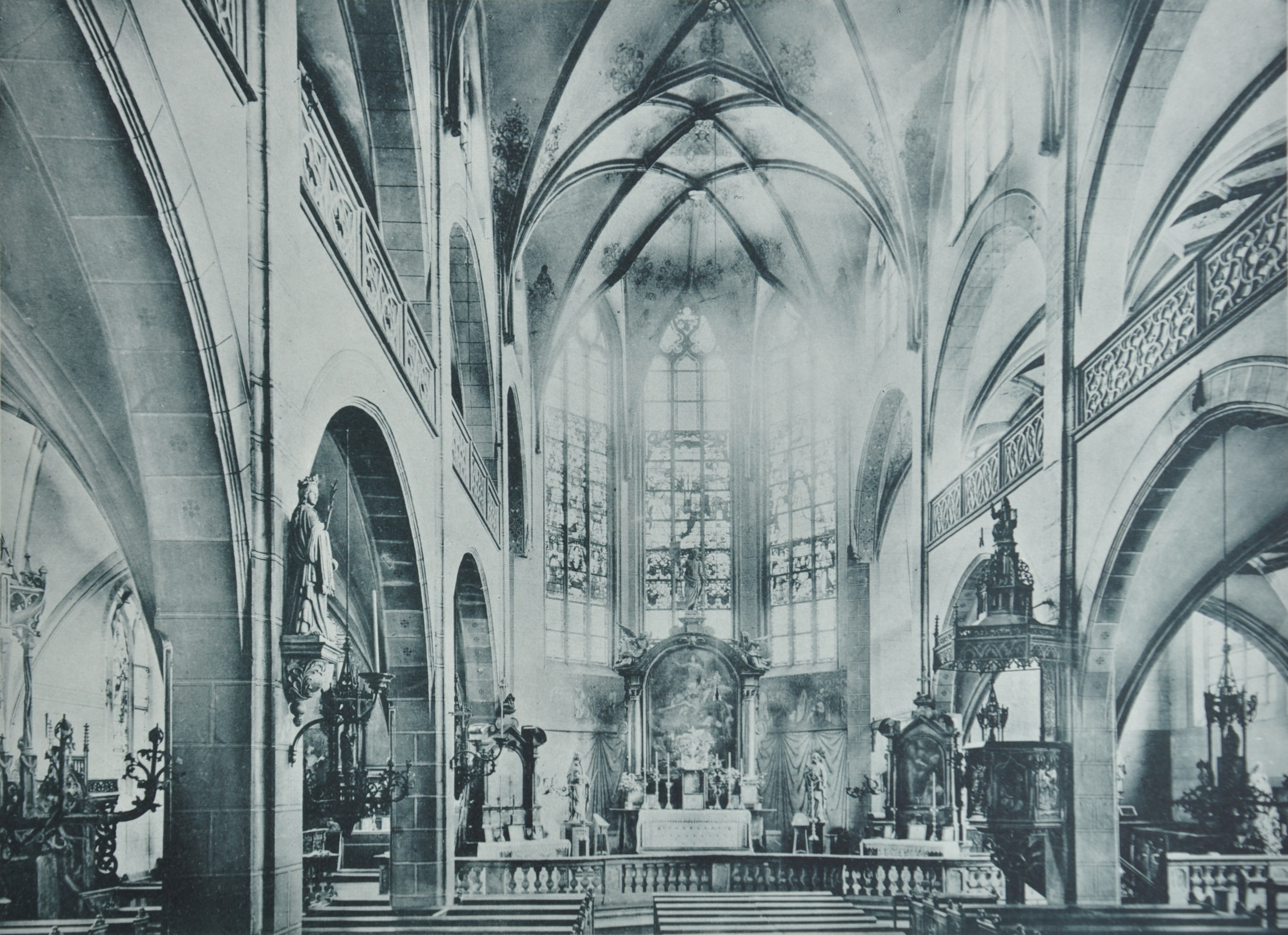
Interior, 1895

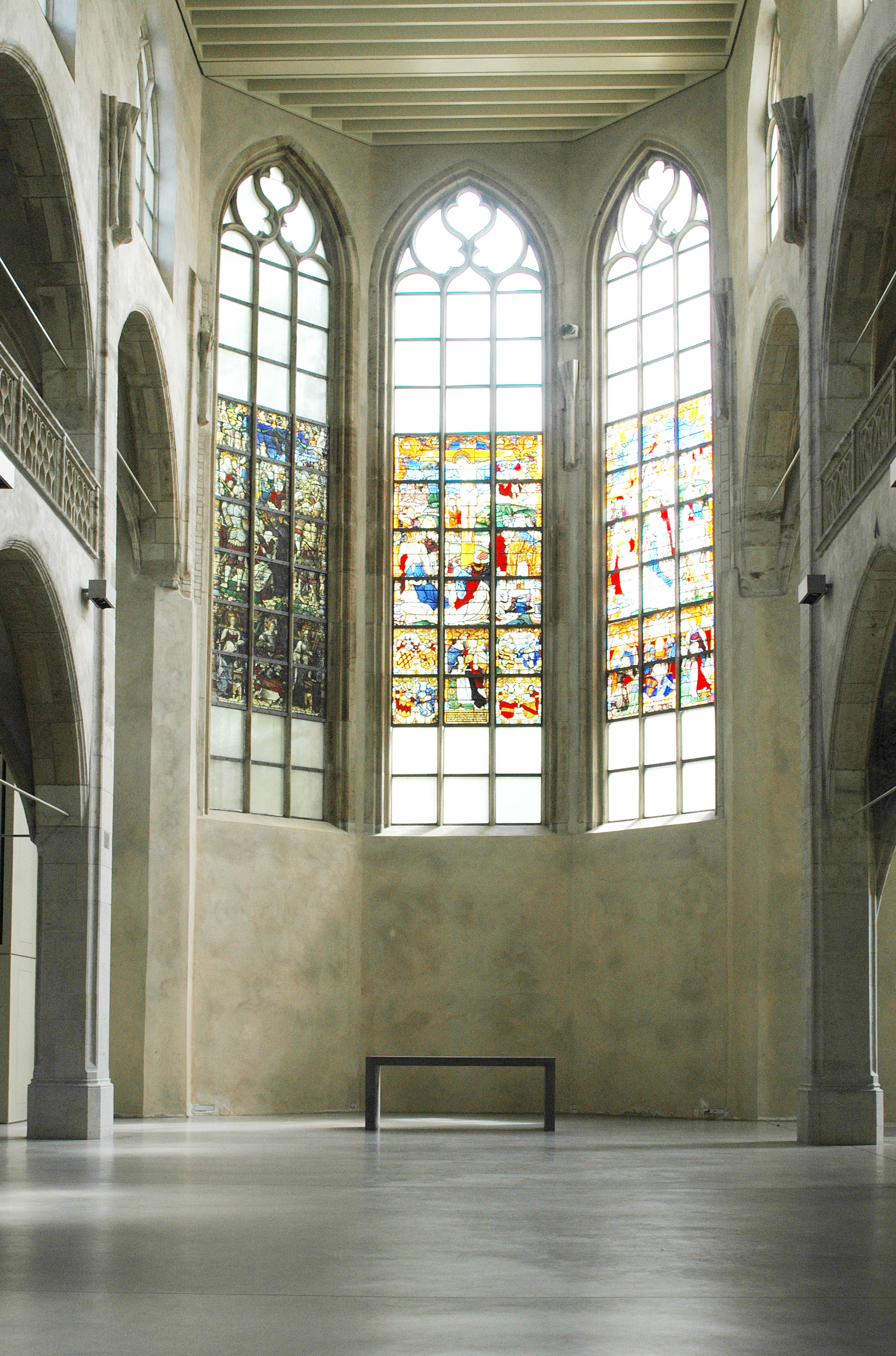
Interior

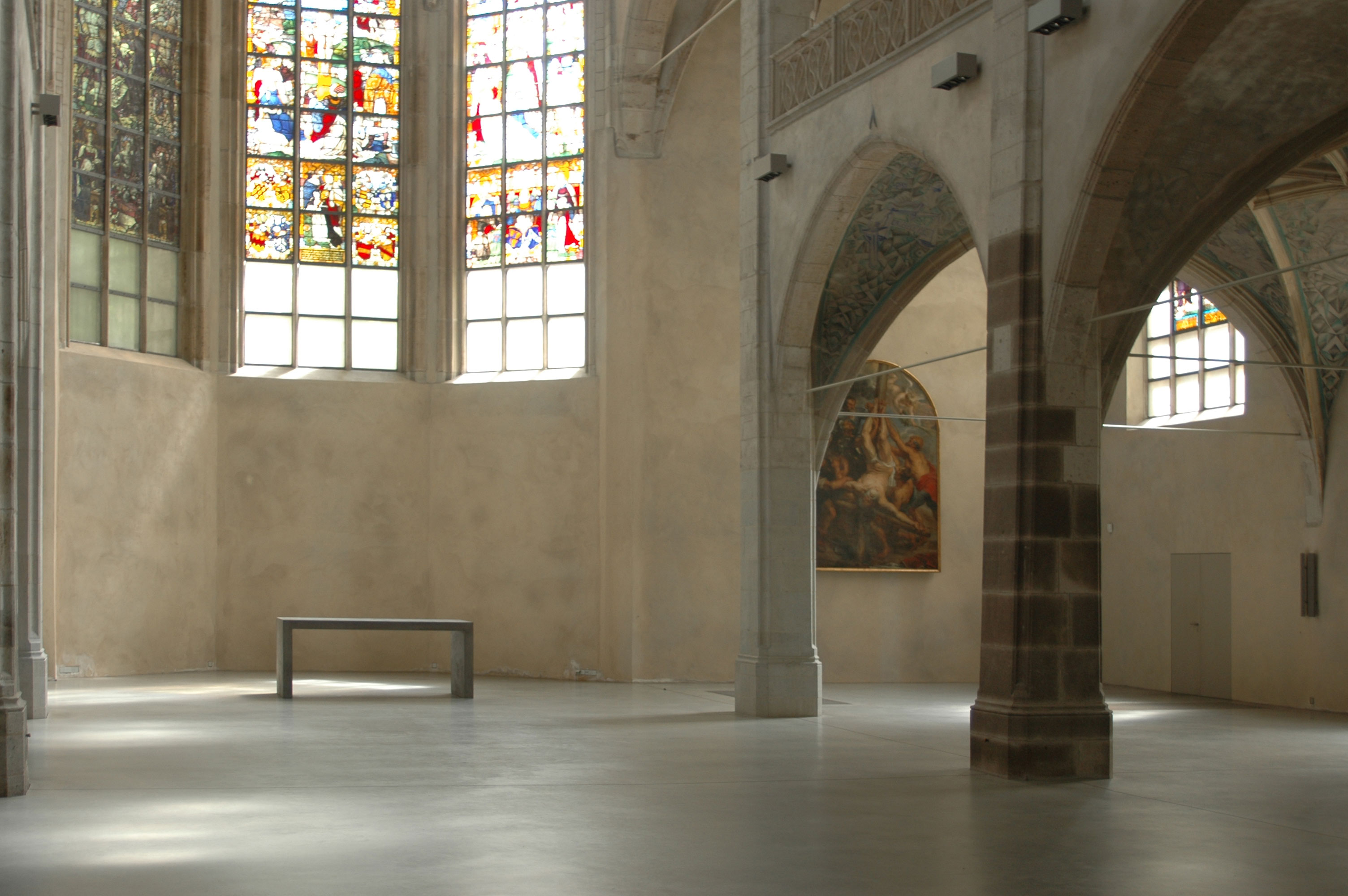
Interior

== See also ==
- List of Jesuit sites

== Bibliography (in German) ==
- Hiltrud Kier: Gotik in Köln. Wienand, Köln 1997. ISBN 3-87909-540-X.
- Nicolas T. Weiser: Offenes Zueinander, Räumliche Dimensionen von Religion und Kunst in der Kunst-Station Sankt Peter Köln. Schnell & Steiner, Regensburg 2002. ISBN 3-7954-1539-X.
- Michael Gassmann, Karl Wilhelm Boll, Kurt Danch: Werkzeuge der Stille – Die neuen Orgeln in Sankt Peter zu Köln. Wienand, Köln 2004. ISBN 3-87909-859-X.
- Hiltrud Westermann-Angerhausen / Guido Schlimbach: Museum Schnütgen und Sankt Peter Schnell & Steiner, Regensburg 2005. ISBN 978-3-7954-6503-2.
- Ivo Rauch und Hartmut Scholz: Sankt Peter zu Köln – Meisterwerke der Glasmalerei. Schnell+Steiner, Regensburg 2007. ISBN 978-3-7954-1959-2.
- Friedhelm Mennekes: Zwischen Freiheit und Bindung Im Gespräch mit Brigitta Lentz über Kirche und Kunst, Wienand, Köln 2008. ISBN 978-3-87909-957-3.
- Guido Schlimbach: Für Friedhelm Mennekes. Kunst-Station Sankt Peter Köln. Texte von Kardinal Joachim Meisner, Arnulf Rainer, James Brown, Peter Bares u. a. Wienand, Köln 2008. ISBN 978-3-87909-961-0.
- Guido Schlimbach: Für einen lange währenden Augenblick. Die Kunst-Station Sankt Peter Köln im Spannungsfeld von Religion und Kunst, Verlag Schnell & Steiner, Regensburg 2009. ISBN 978-3-7954-2110-6.
- Dominik Susteck: Peter Bares. Komponist und Orgelvisionär. Dohr, Köln 2011. ISBN 978-3-936655-17-9.
- Guido Schlimbach: Eines der besten Bilder, die meine Hand geschaffen hat. Peter Paul Rubens, Die Kreuzigung Petri. Kunst-Station Sankt Peter Köln, Köln 2015. (ohne ISBN).
- Hoffs, Gerhard. "Glocken katholischer Kirchen Kölns" (PDF) (in German). pp. 205–213. Archived from the original on 2017-01-29.
