= Karl Band =

German architect

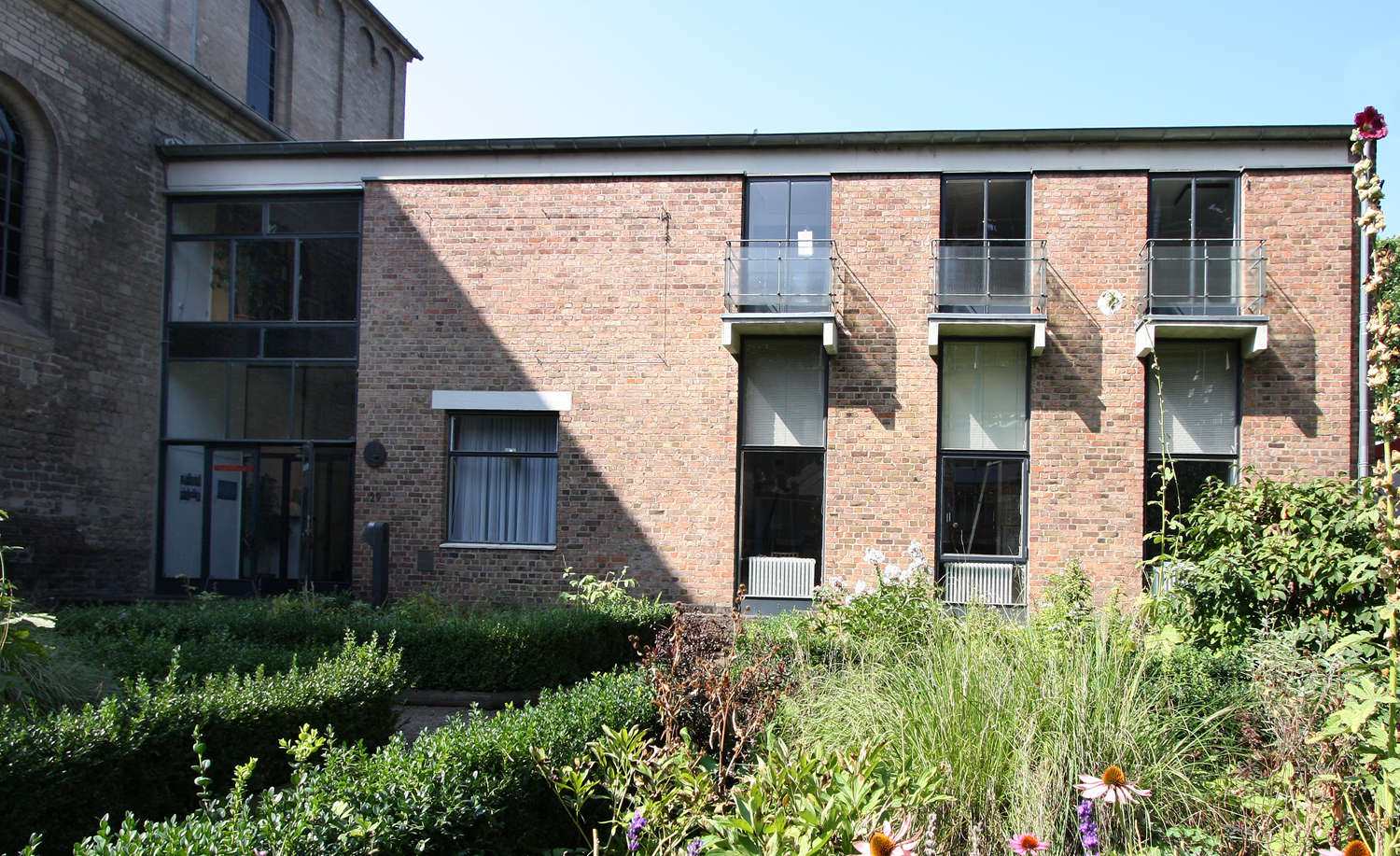
Administrative extension to the Schnütgen Museum

Karl Friedrich Heinrich Band (8 November 1900 – 6 October 1995) was a German architect.

== Origin ==
Born in Cologne, Band was the son of the architect Heinrich Band (1855–1919), a long-time associate of the building councillor Hermann Otto Pflaume, whose office he also headed for a time. He was also related to the painter Michael Welter (1808–1892), who, among other things, painted the Cologne parish church Basilica of St. Cunibert, Cologne after the tower was rebuilt in the 19th century, and with Heinrich Band, the inventor of the bandoneon, a brother of his grandfather.

Band was married to Annegret Band-Löffler and had children Michaela and Gero († 1983) with her, who was his junior partner from 1965. In 1988, he married Gertrud Band-Neyses.

== Professional career ==
Band attended the Apostelgymnasium and then studied art history in Bonn (1918–1921) and later architecture in Karlsruhe (1921–1924) under Hermann Billing and Otto Gruber. Since 1919 he was a member of the Catholic student fraternity KDStV Bavaria Bonn. After his studies, he worked in various studios in Cologne, such as Hans Schumacher (1925–1927), Heinrich Renard and Eugen Fabricius, before opening his own office in 1928. In September 1929 Band became an employee of the church architect Eduard Endler, and from December 1930 he was his partner. In the same year he also passed the second state examination with subsequent appointment as government master builder. According to an agreement, after Endler's death (1932), his son Clemens joined the studio as a partner (Band und Endler firm); however, Endler did not continue this partnership after the war and his imprisonment.

Conscripted into military service, Band was commissioned in the early 1940s to plan and build accommodation for the V 1 production in Peenemünde-West and other work. As far as he was able, he and like-minded people tried to save the substance of the war-damaged Förderverein Romanische Kirchen Köln. Shortly after the end of the war, he was commissioned by the occupying powers to draw up expert reports on the condition of the church monuments.

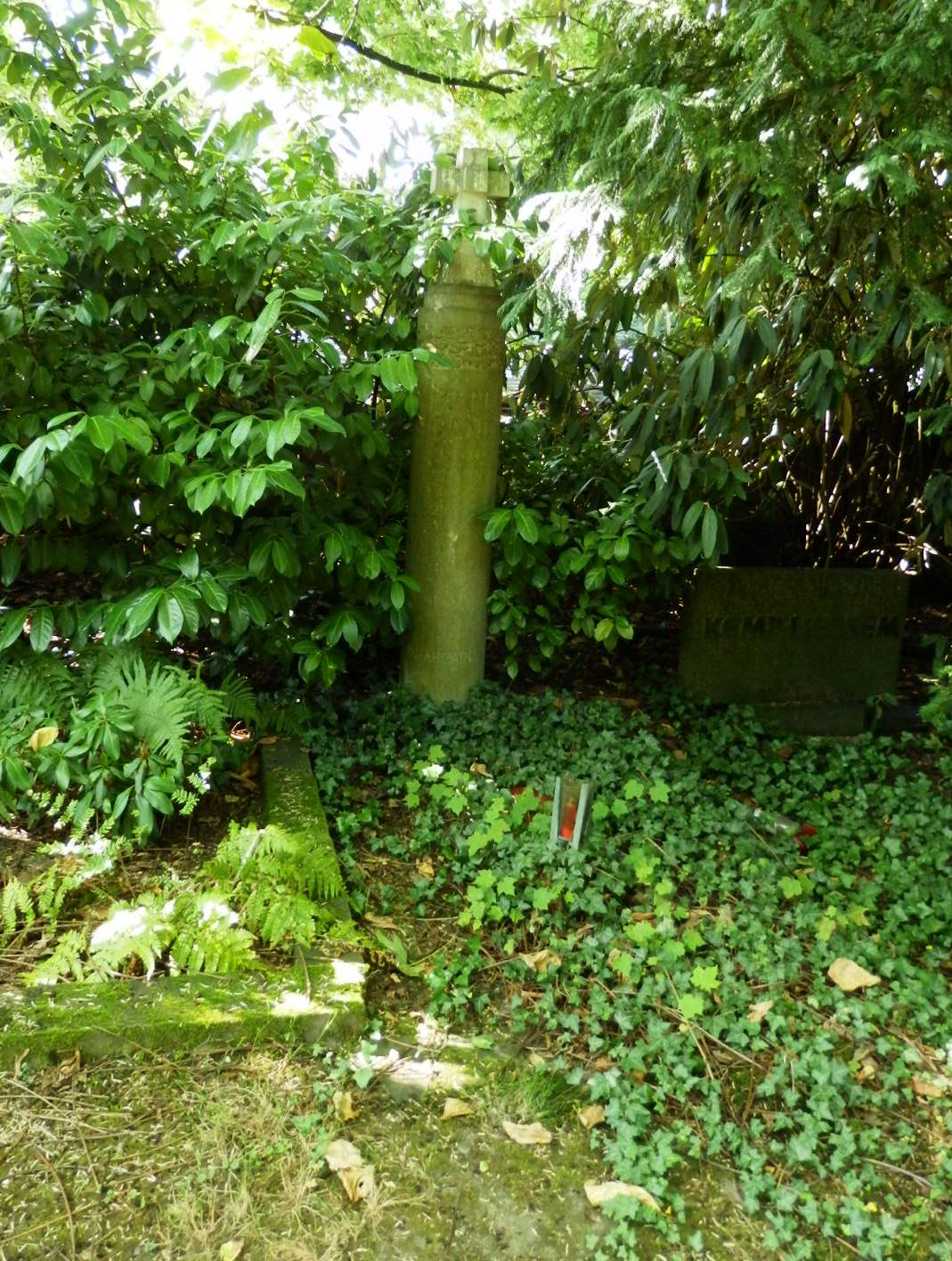
Grab at Cologne's Melaten cemetery

In 1950/1951, Band built his private house next to the church of Basilica of St. Cunibert, Cologne. Until 1965 and again from 1983, after the death of his son Gero, Karl Band ran the studio alone, from which the designs for approximately 140 completed commercial buildings, 100 residential and commercial buildings and over 100 churches as well as church renovations and reconstructions emerged.

== Aftermath ==
Band died on 6 October 1995 at the age of 94 and was buried in the Melaten Cemetery (Lit.C, between Lit.V and Lit.W).

Band belonged to a circle of artists and architects also titled "Cologne school", which included Rudolf Schwarz, Dominikus Böhm and Gottfried Böhm, Josef Bernard and his former student Hans Schilling.

Since 2007, Band's estate has been processed in the Historical Archive of the City of Cologne to enable its later use for scientific purposes.

In 2014, the green space between Konrad-Adenauer-Ufer and Kunibertsgasse – near his house – was named Karl-Band-Platz.

== Work ==
=== Buildings ===
==== Cologne ====
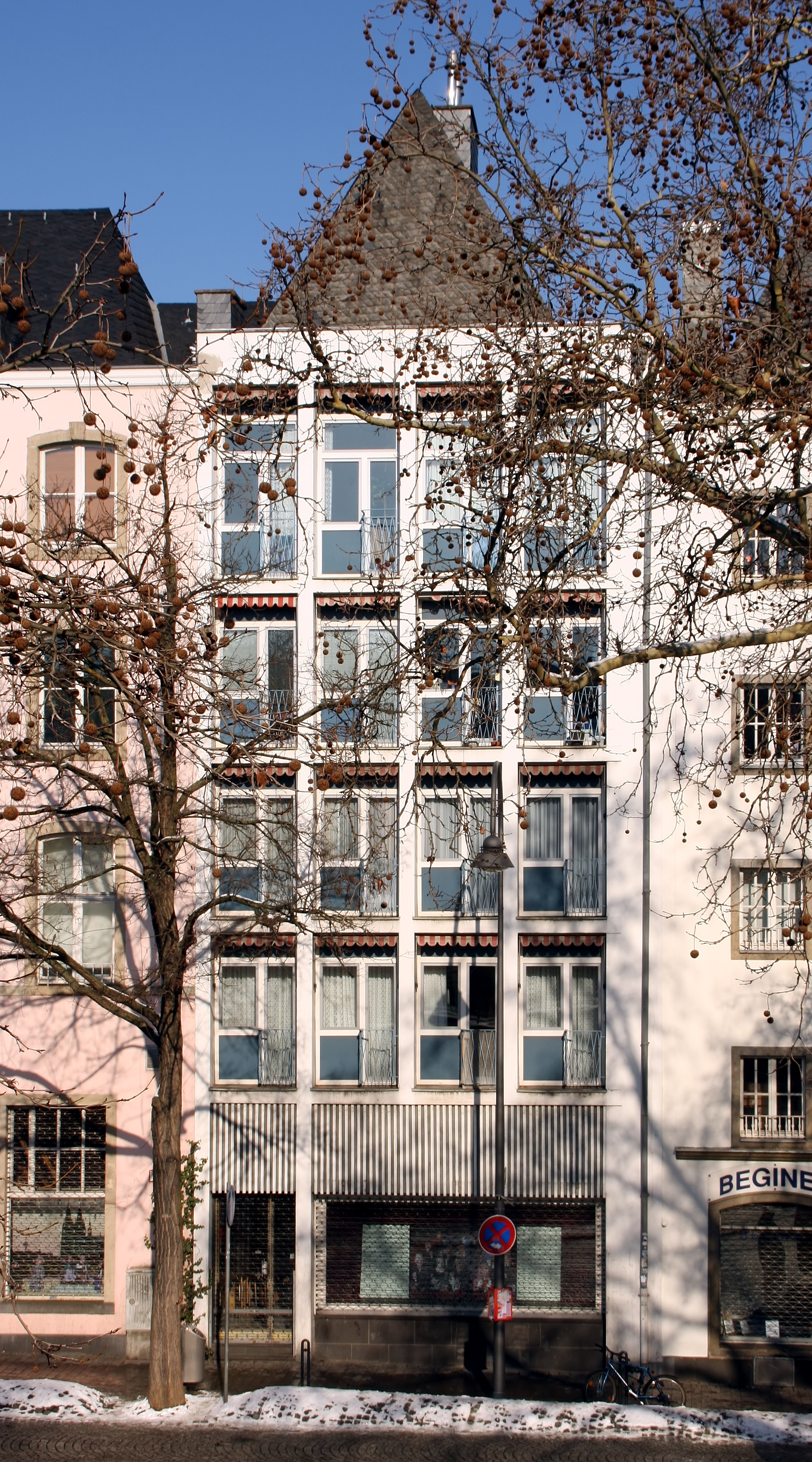
Wohn- und Geschäftshaus Markmannsgasse 5

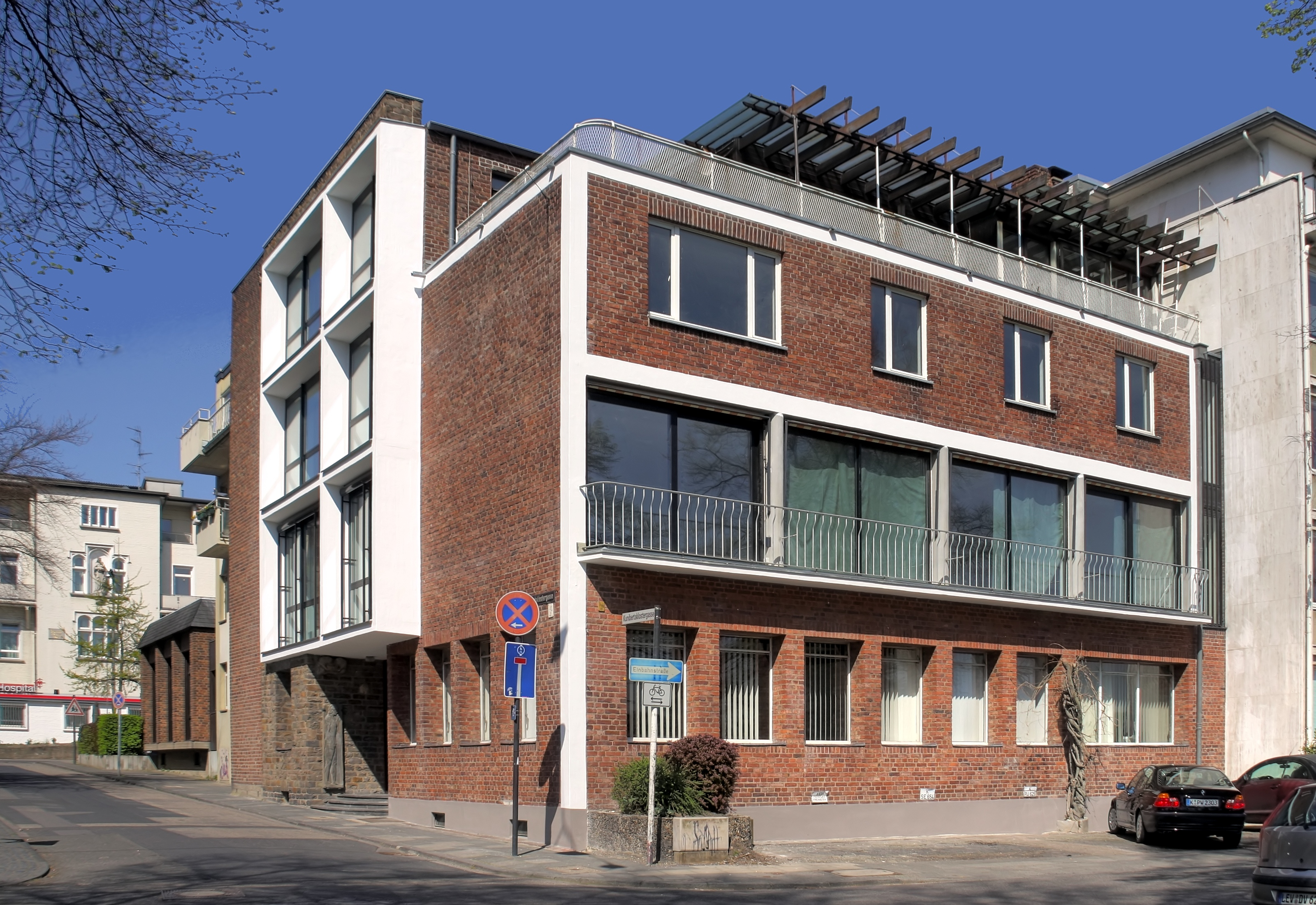
Haus Band, Kunibertsklostergasse 1

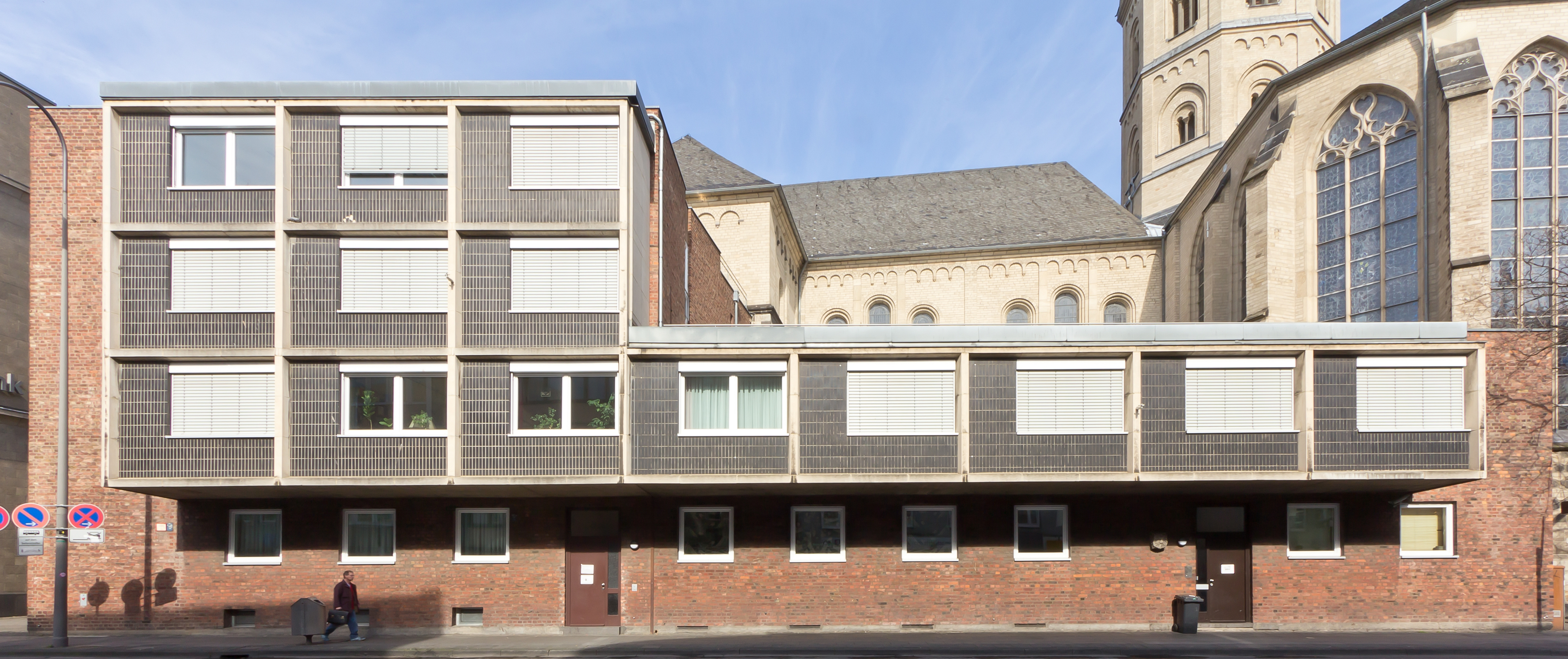
Dominikanerkloster bei St. Andreas, Komödienstraße

- 1929: Mitwirkung bei dem Umbau des Rheinlandhauses in Deutz
- 1938–1940: Pfarrkirche St. Norbert in Dellbrück
- from 1943 (after 1945): Reconstruction of the building of the St. Marien-Hospital
- after 1945: Reconstruction of the Deutz Abbey in Cologne
- 1945–1955/1968: Wiederaufbau der Kirche Basilica of St. Cunibert, Cologne
- 1950: Laden- und Ausstellungsgebäude für das Möbelhaus Gustav Schirmer, Cäcilienstr. 25 (2007 abgebrochen)
- 1950–1951: Wohn- und Geschäftshaus Markmannsgasse 3–5 (collaboration with Hans Schilling)
- 1950–1951: Wohnhaus und Atelier Band, Kunibertsklostergasse 1 (früher 3)
- 1951: Geschäftshaus Hohenzollernring 14
- 1951–1952 Kath. Pfarrkirche "St. Elisabeth" in Mülheim
- 1951–1954 Kath. Pfarrkirche "St. Dreifaltigkeit" in Poll
- 1952–1955: Wiederaufbau des Gürzenich (together with Rudolf Schwarz)
- 1952/1953–1967 Wiederaufbau der Kirche St. Gregorius im Elend
- 1953–1955: neue Krypta und Grabkapelle für den Heiligen Albertus Magnus in the St. Andrew's Church, Cologne church
- 1953–1957: Anbau für Bibliothek und Verwaltung des Museum Schnütgen und Wiederaufbau der Kirche St. Cäcilien, Cäcilienstraße 29
- 1954–1958: Humboldt-Gymnasium, Karthäuserwall 40
- 1954: Dompropstei, Margarethenkloster 5
- 1955: Pfarrhaus der Kirche St. Kunibert, Kunibertsklostergasse 2
- 1956: „Haus der Begegnung“ des katholischen Männerwerks, Jabachstraße 4–8
- 1956–1957: Wohn- und Geschäftshaus des Wilhelm Wefers „Paramente Wefers“, Komödienstr. 97–103 / Burgmauer 60
- 1956–1957: Expansion of the church and construction of the new rectory "Zum Heiligen Geist" in Zollstock
- 1957: Rectory of St. Andrew
- 1960–1972: Reconstruction of the Cologne City Hall (with Eugen Weiler, 1961 competition, Einweihung 1972)
- 1961–1963: Reconstruction of the parish church St. Johann Baptist
- 1962–1964: New construction of the parish church St. Clemens in Niehl

==== Outside Cologne ====
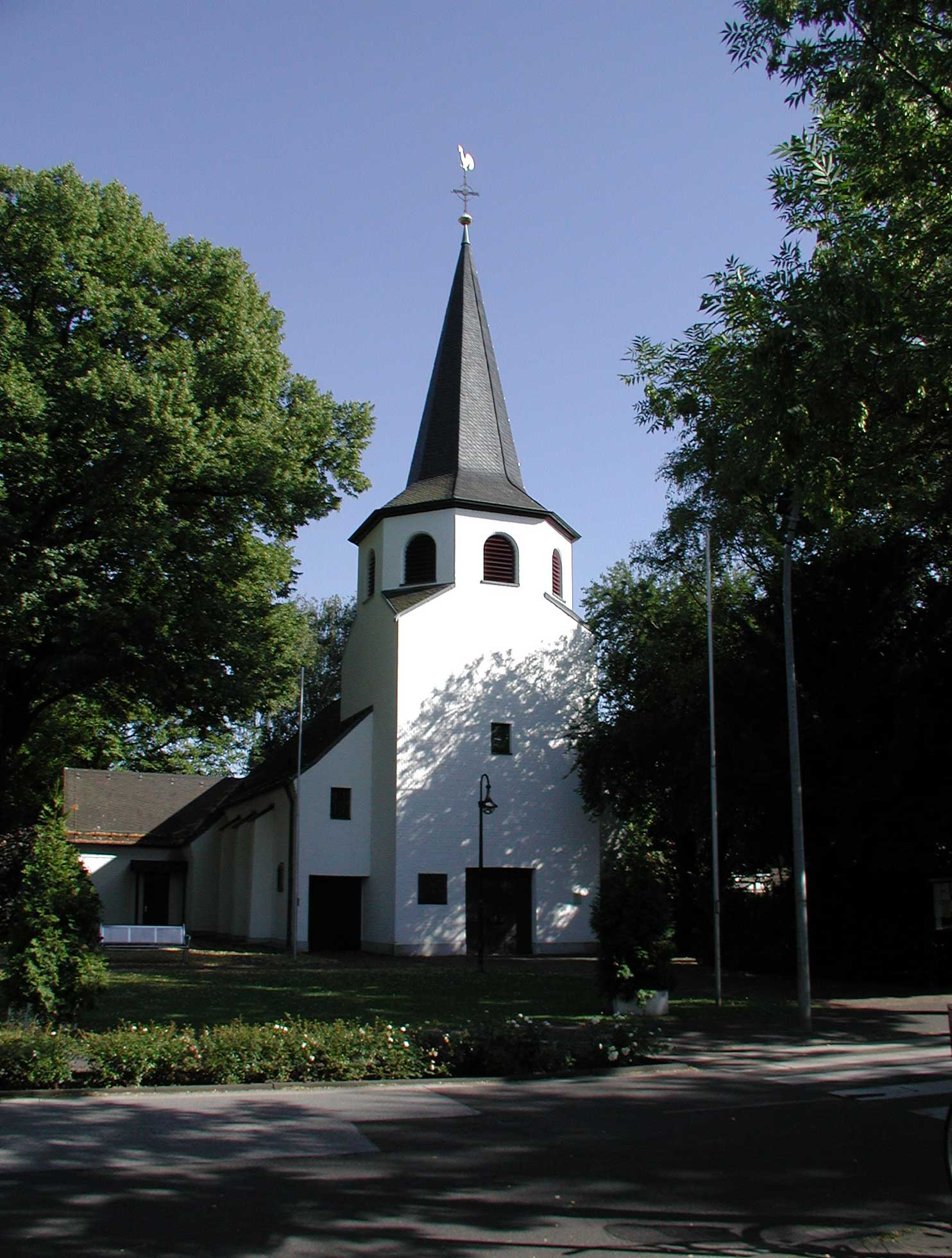
St. Brictius, Stotzheim

- 1932: Erweiterung der Kapelle St. Mariä Himmelfahrt in Birlinghoven
- 1936/1937: Umbau der St.-Nikolaus-Kirche in Wipperfürth
- 1936/1937: St. Brictius in Stotzheim
- ca. 1942: Planung und Ausführung von Belegschaftsunterkünften für die V1-Fabrik in Peenemünde
- 1953–1955: Reconstruction of St. Peter in Zülpich
- 1956: Umbau der Kirche St. Johann Baptist in (Hürth-)Kendenich
- 1957: Erweiterung und Umbau der Kirche St. Severin Frechen Chronik des Frechener Geschichtsvereins (PDF-Dokument)
- June 1959–1960: Gelsenkirchen-Hassel, St. Theresia
- 1960–1962: Bonn, Nordstadt, katholische Pfarrkirche St. Franziskus (with Werner Fritzen)
- 1963: Erweiterung der Kirche St. Johann Baptist in Refrath
- 1966–1968: Kirchenerweiterung St. Severin, Hürth-Hermülheim
- 1969: Erweiterung der romanischen Kirche St. Clemens (Drolshagen) durch einen Anbau an der Südseite.
- 1969–1970: St. Johannes der Evangelist (Köln-Stammheim) (with Gero Band)
- 1970–1971: Umbau und Erweiterung der Kirche St. Mariä Geburt in Hürth-Efferen
- 1971–1973 mit Sohn Gero (Oktober 71 Grundsteinlegung) Sebastianusstift, Altenwohnheim der St.-Dionysius-Gemeinde in Gleuel (jetzt Caritas)
- 1975: Bad Honnef, Ortsteil Rhöndorf, Museumsgebäude der Stiftung Bundeskanzler-Adenauer-Haus

=== Competitions ===
- 1925–1926: Kath. Kirche in Bickendorf
- 1935: "Altstadtsanierung Köln" (Martinsviertel), Erster Preis
