= Förderverein Romanische Kirchen Köln =

Preservation society

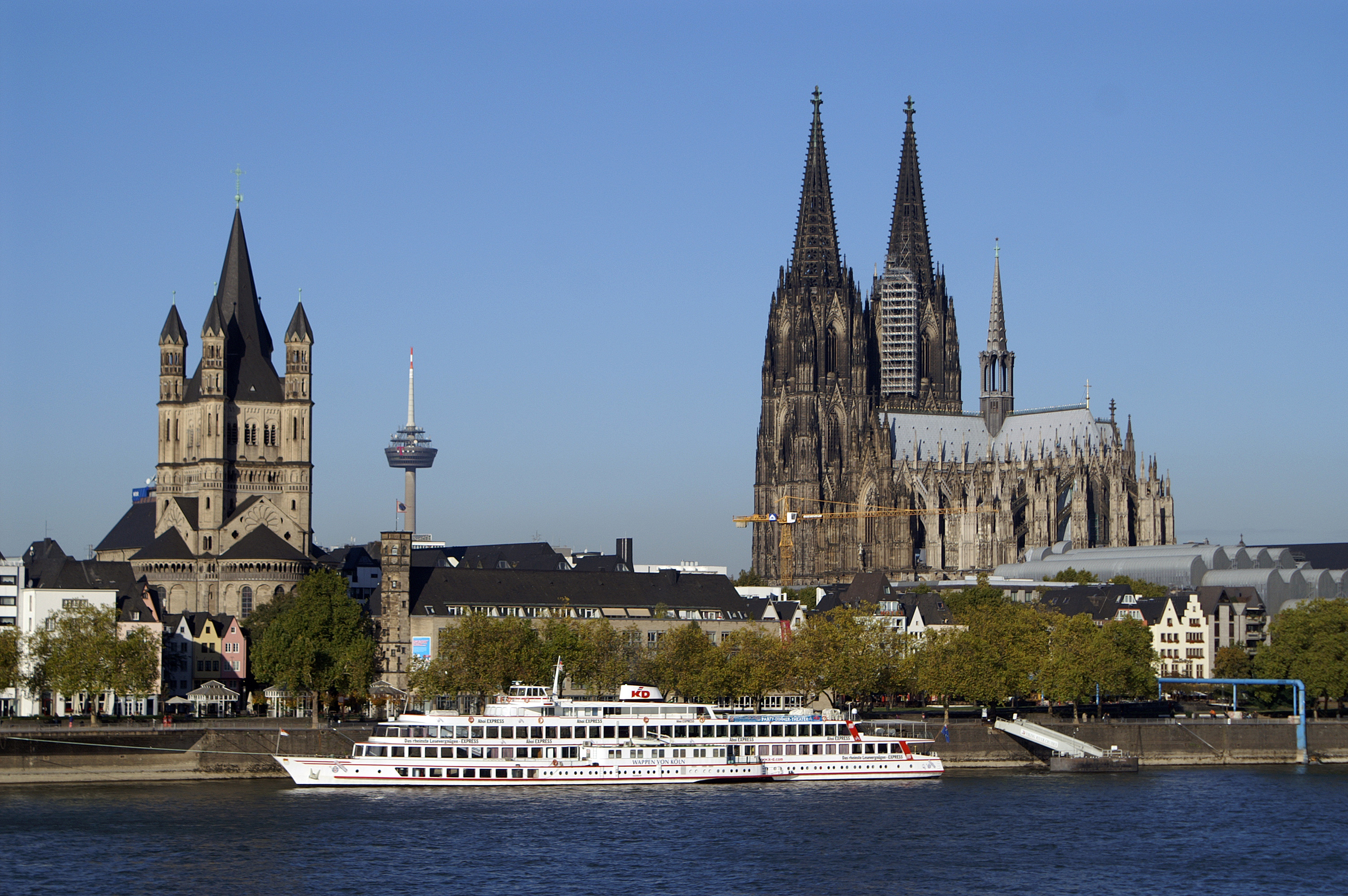
The Romanesque Groß St. Martin and the Gothic Cologne Cathedral.

The Förderverein Romanische Kirchen Köln e. V. is a German association which financially and conceptually supports the research, restoration and preservation of Romanesque churches in Cologne. It was founded in 1981 and also organises public relations, guided tours and lectures to improve public awareness of these churches. Günter Heidecke was one of its founders and also acted as its chairman until 2002.

In 2012 the Förderverein set up a foundation (the Stiftung Romanische Kirchen Köln) to continue funding the Förderverein's activities. Since 2013 the Förderverein has also been advocating for the Romanesque churches of Cologne to become a UNESCO World Heritage Site, though such an application was first considered in 1980 by the city conservator Hiltrud Kier.

== List of churches supported ==
=== 12 major churches ===
The Förderverein began with the twelve major Romanesque churches in the city:

- St. Andreas
- St. Aposteln
- St. Cäcilien
- St. Georg
- St. Gereon
- St. Kunibert
- St. Maria im Kapitol
- St. Maria in Lyskirchen
- Groß St. Martin
- St. Pantaleon
- St. Severin
- St. Ursula

=== 13 small churches ===
13 smaller churches outside Cologne's medieval city wall were later added:

- Deutz, Abtei Alt St. Heribert
- Dünnwald, St. Nikolaus
- Esch, St. Martinus
- Heumar, Alt St. Cornelius (Alter Turm)
- Lindenthal, Krieler Dömchen St. Stephanus
- Lövenich, St. Severin
- Merkenich, St. Brictius
- Niederzündorf, St. Michael
- Niehl, Alt St. Katharina
- Oberzündorf, St. Martin
- Rheinkassel, St. Amandus
- Rodenkirchen, Alt St. Maternus (Kapellchen)
- Westhoven, Nikolaus-Kapelle

=== Former parish churches ===
Added in 2005 were:

- St. Johann Baptist
- St. Peter - 11th-century tower
- Alt St. Alban - now part of the Gürzenich
- St. Kolumba - now part of the Kolumba-Museum
- Alt St. Mauritius (Köln-Buchheim) - 1200 apse
- St. Hubertus (Flittard) - 12th-century tower

Two of these only had partially preserved Romanesque elements, now integrated into later buildings. Alt St. Pankratius in Köln-Worringen was considered but not added.

== Bibliography (in German) ==
- Colonia Romanica. Jahrbuch des Fördervereins Romanische Kirchen Köln e.V. Erscheint jährlich seit 1986 im Greven-Verlag, Köln.
- Hiltrud Kier: Via Sacra zu Fuß, Kölns Städtebau und die Romanischen Kirchen. Bachem Verlag, Köln 2003 (²/2005) ISBN 3-7616-1704-6.
- Ulrich Krings, Otmar Schwab: Köln: Die Romanischen Kirchen – Zerstörung und Wiederherstellung. Reihe Stadtspuren Bd. 2, Köln, Bachem Verlag, 2007 (712 S. mit CD Chronologie des Wiederaufbaus).
- Sybille Fraquelli: Zwölf Tore zum Himmel. Kinder entdecken: Die Romanischen Kirchen in Köln. J.P. Bachem Verlag, Köln 2007. ISBN 978-3-7616-2148-6.
- Sybille Fraquelli: Ein bunter Traum. Kölns romanische Kirchen im Historismus (Begleitband 2 zur Sonderausstellung im Kölnischen Stadtmuseum 2012), Emons, Köln 2012, ISBN 978-3-95451-053-5.
- Jürgen Kaiser (text) and Florian Monheim (photos): Die großen romanischen Kirchen in Köln, Greven Verlag, Köln 2013, ISBN 978-3-7743-0615-8.
- Jürgen Kaiser (text) and Florian Monheim (photos): Kleiner Führer der großen romanischen Kirchen in Köln, Hrsg. vom Förderverein Romanische Kirchen Köln e. V. und vom Rheinischen Verein für Denkmalpflege und Landschaftsschutz e. V., Greven Verlag, Köln 2015, ISBN 978-3-7743-0664-6
- Hiltrud Kier and Ulrich Krings: Die Romanischen Kirchen in Köln, Köln, 3. Auflage 1986.
- Hiltrud Kier: Die romanische Kirchen in Köln. Führer zu Geschichte und Ausstattung, J. P. Bachem Verlag, Köln 2014, ISBN 978-3-7616-2842-3.
- Hiltrud Kier: Die kleinen romanischen Kirchen. Führer zur Geschichte und Entwicklung Kölner Vororte, J. P. Bachem, Köln 2015, ISBN 978-3-7616-2944-4.
- Sabine Czymmek: Die Kölner Romanischen Kirchen, Schatzkunst, Bd. 1, Köln 2008, Bd. 2, Köln 2009 (= Colonia Romanica, Jahrbuch des Fördervereins Romanische Kirchen Köln e. V. Bd. 22, 2007 und 23, 2008).
