= Adrien de Fléron =

Adrien de Fléron (1577–1633) was a clergyman, author and negotiator from the Prince-Bishopric of Liège.

== Life ==
Fléron was born in the city of Liège in 1577, the son of Servais de Fléron and Marguerite Le Polain, both of whome belonged to patrician lineages. His father was a jurist who had served as an alderman, and later as secretary and privy councillor to the prince-bishop. Adrien studied at Leuven University, graduating doctor of both laws in 1604. In 1607 he went to Rome, travelling by way of Paris, Lyon and Turin, in an unsuccessful attempt to secure appointment as auditor of the Roman Rota. In 1611 he returned to Liège, where he became a friend of François de Montmorency, dean of the cathedral chapter of Saint Lambert's Cathedral, Liège, with whom he travelled in France. In 1618 he was appointed a cathedral canon.

During the Danish phase of the Thirty Years' War (1625-1629), Fléron several times travelled to northern Germany to undertake negotiations on behalf of the Count of Tilly, who in 1626 interceded with the Pope to obtain him the provostry of the Church of St Cunibert in Cologne. Fléron was in Hersfeld, Hesse, in 1626, and in the Duchy of Brunswick in 1627. In 1627 he was also present at the sieges of Nienburg and Wolfenbüttel. He then spent time at Hildesheim, where he was welcomed by the canons of Hildesheim Cathedral as a representative of their counterparts in Liège.

Around 1628 Fléron undertook mediation between the States of Liège and Prince-Bishop Ferdinand of Bavaria, then resident at Bonn, and between Tilly and the city of Hamburg. In 1629 he travelled to Albrecht von Wallenstein at Güstrow, where he spent five weeks, before continuing to Rostock, Wismar and Lübeck, where the peace agreement with Christian IV of Denmark, the Treaty of Lübeck, was being negotiated. He then again travelled between Tilly and Wallenstein, before spending six weeks at the court of Emperor Ferdinand II in Vienna.

At the conclusion of his diplomatic activities, Fléron exchanged his provostry in Cologne for a canonry at the Collegiate Church of St Denis, Liège, which he then resigned in favour of his nephew, Antoine de Libert. Probably about this time he became spiritual councillor to the bench of aldermen of the city of Liège. His brother, Gérard de Fléron, was knighted by the emperor and became alderman of Liège and councillor to the feudal court of the principality.

Fléron died in Liège in 1633.

== Writings ==
Fléron wrote a volume of memoirs that remained unpublished, and a work commemorating Tilly under the title Promulsis Elogii Tilliani (published in Liège by Jean Ouwerx in 1630), which included an Italian eulogy of the count by Antonio Abbondanti and was dedicated to Pier Luigi Carafa, Apostolic Nuncio to Cologne.
