= St. George's Church, Cologne =

Romanesque church in Cologne, Germany

Coordinates: 50°55′55″N 6°57′25″E

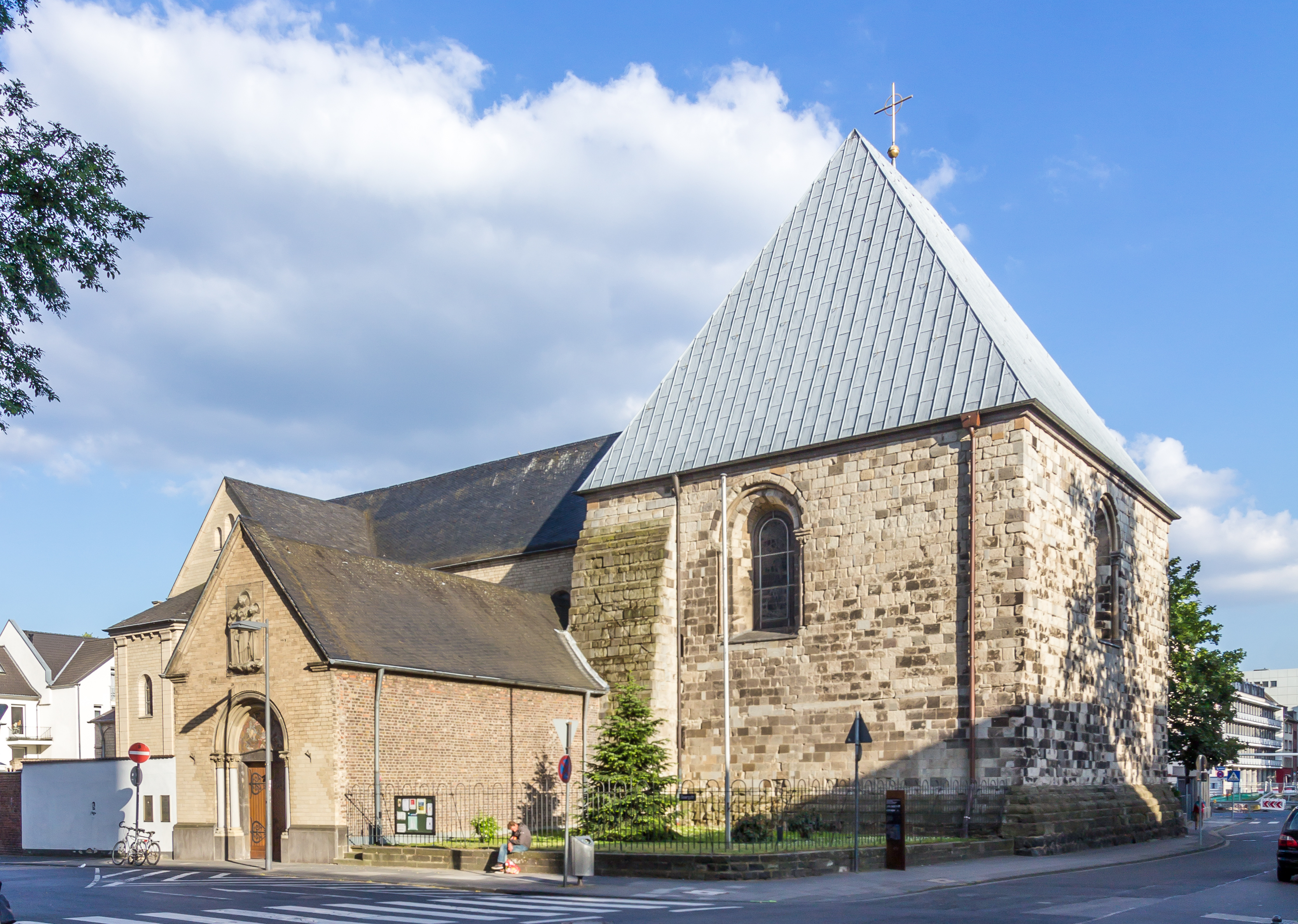
St. Georg's Church, Cologne

St. Georg's Church is one of twelve Romanesque churches in the city of Cologne, Germany.

== History ==
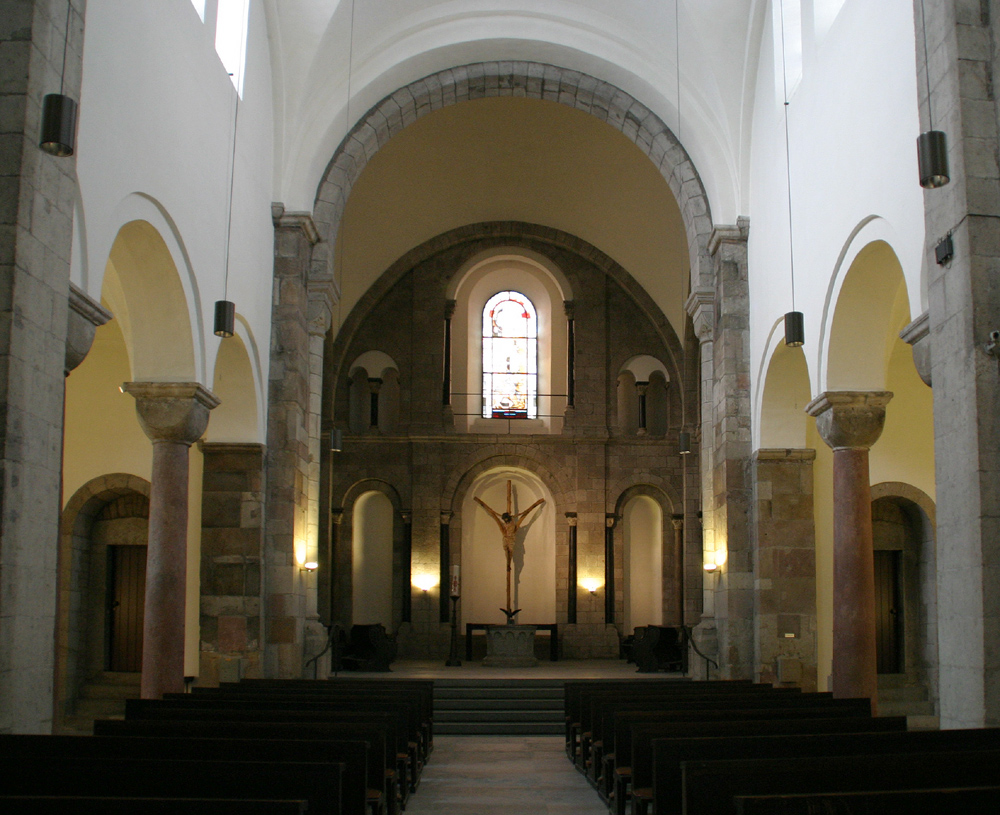
Interior of St Georg's Church

The date of the foundation of St Georg's is unknown, but it was consecrated towards the end of the 11th century. The nave was vaulted in the mid-12th century, the westwerk was added in 1188 and the entrance portal on the north side in 1551. The church was damaged during World War II, resulting in extensive restoration which included the removal of the Baroque extension to the westwerk and replacement with a simple hip roof in the Romanesque style.

== Architecture ==
St Georg's has the trefoil-shaped eastern end typical of other Romanesque churches of Cologne, its chancel and transepts each terminating in an apse. The nave is unique in Cologne in having its arcade supported on columns rather than piers.

There is a robust westwerk with walls of 5 metres thick, suggesting that it was intended to be much taller than actually built. The original Romanesque roof of the westwerk was replaced with a Baroque belfry, but this was damaged during World War II and later replaced with a steeply pitched hip roof of copper. During the late 1920s the church had been entirely glazed by the Expressionist artist, Johan Thorn Prikker. These windows were lost during the war, but have been reproduced from the original cartoons.

== See also ==
- Twelve Romanesque churches of Cologne
- Cologne Cathedral
- German architecture
- Romanesque architecture
- List of regional characteristics of Romanesque churches
- Romanesque secular and domestic architecture

== Literature ==
- Hiltrud Kier: Via Sacra zu Fuß, Kölns Städtebau und die Romanischen Kirchen. Bachem Verlag, Köln 2003 (²/2005) ISBN 3-7616-1704-6.
- Ulrich Krings, Otmar Schwab: Köln: Die Romanischen Kirchen – Zerstörung und Wiederherstellung. Reihe Stadtspuren Bd. 2, Köln, Bachem Verlag, 2007 (712 S. mit CD Chronologie des Wiederaufbaus).
- Sybille Fraquelli: Zwölf Tore zum Himmel. Kinder entdecken: Die Romanischen Kirchen in Köln. J.P. Bachem Verlag, Köln 2007. ISBN 978-3-7616-2148-6
- Hiltrud Kier und Ulrich Krings: Die Romanischen Kirchen in Köln, Köln, 3.Auflage 1986.
- Sabine Czymmek: Die Kölner Romanischen Kirchen, Schatzkunst, Bd. 1, Köln 2008, Bd. 2, Köln 2009 (= Colonia Romanica, Jahrbuch des Fördervereins Romanische Kirchen Köln e. V. Bd. 22, 2007 und 23, 2008)
