= Cunibert =

Ninth bishop of Cologne

Saint Cunibert
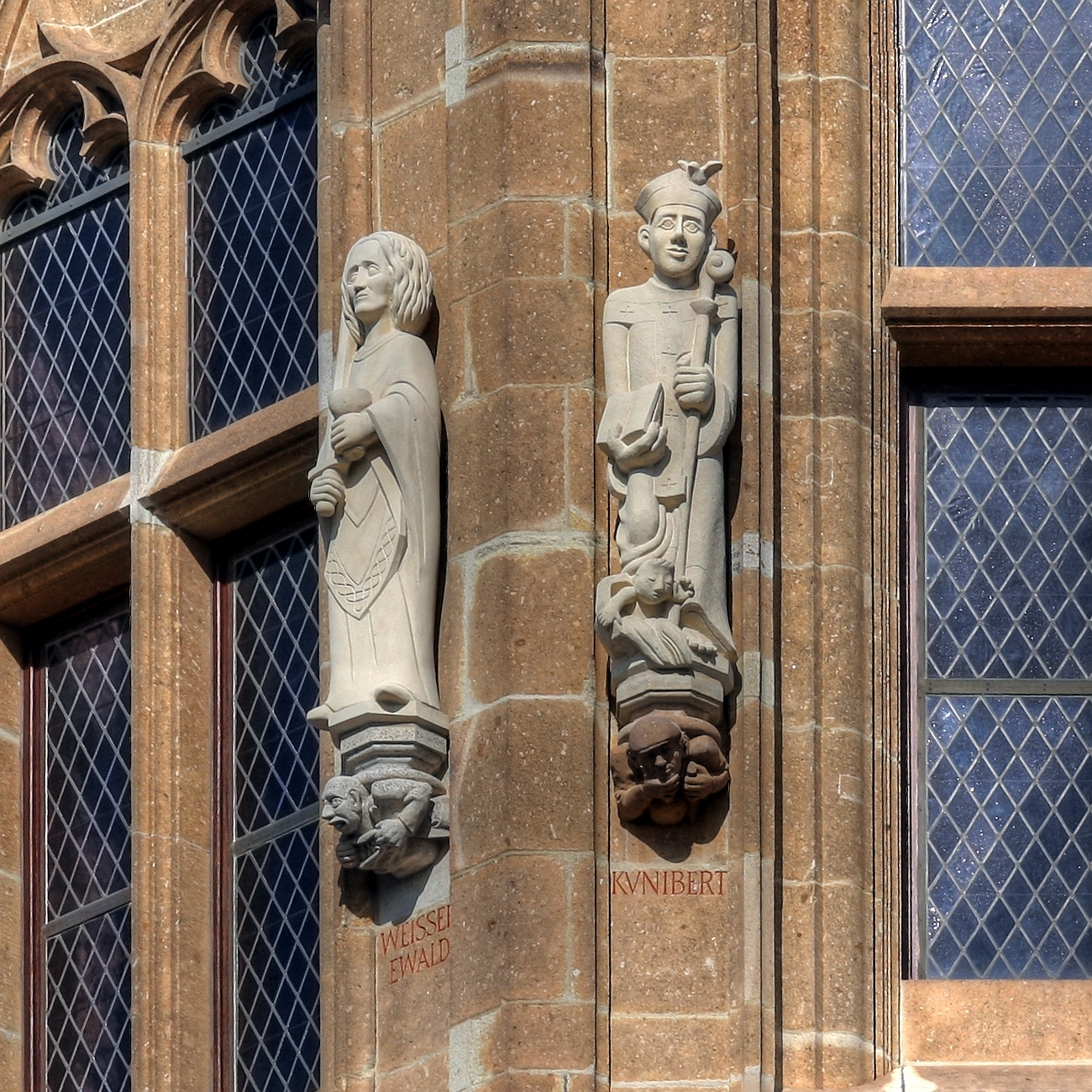
- Statue of Kunibert on the tower of Cologne City Hall
- Feast: November 12

Cunibert, Cunipert, or Kunibert (c. 600 – 12 November c. 663) was the ninth bishop of Cologne, from 623 to his death. Contemporary sources mention him between 627 and 643.

== Life ==
Cunibert was born somewhere along the Moselle to a family of the local Ripuarian Frankish aristocracy, and educated in Metz at the court of Chlothar II. He entered the church and became archdeacon of Trier. He was made bishop of Cologne in 623, and attended the Synod of Clichy in 626/627.

As bishop, Cunibert was an advisor to King Dagobert I, and served as tutor to his son and heir Sigebert III. In 633 or 634 Sigebert was invested as king of Austrasia. Following this, Dagobert made Cunibert and Adalgisel, the mayor of the palace, co-regents of the kingdom. Following the death of Adalgisel's successor, Pepin of Landen, Cunibert served as the chief public official of the king, in which capacity he revised the Lex Ribuaria.

Throughout his episcopacy, monasticism flourished and churches were founded and restored. He is regarded today as a saint by the Roman Catholic church and his feast day is the day of his death: November 12. He is buried in a church bearing his name in Cologne, the city where he lived and died.
