= Rupert of Deutz =

Benedictine theologian (c. 1075/1080–c. 1129)

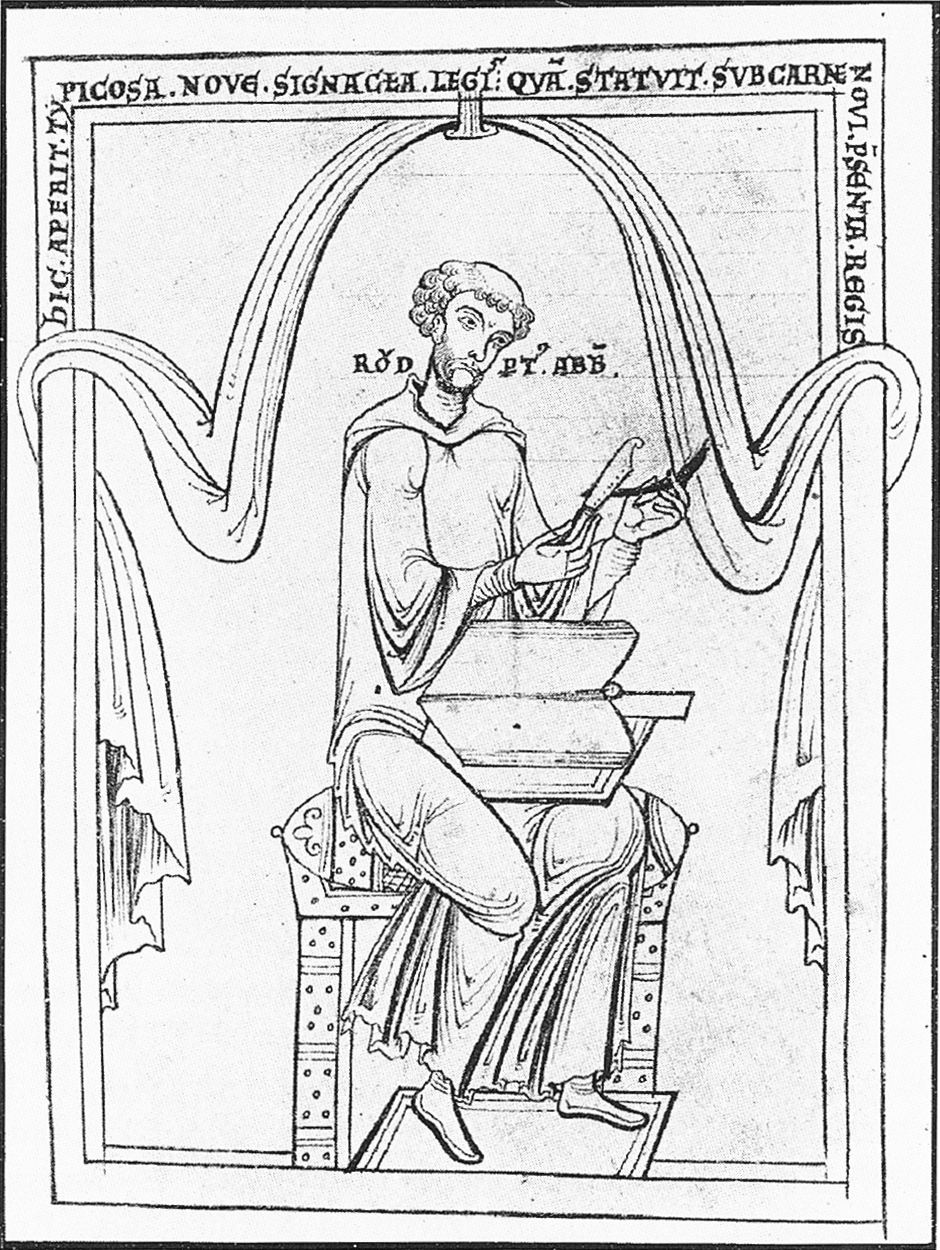
Rupert of Deutz

Rupert of Deutz (Latin: Rupertus Tuitiensis; c. 1075/1080 – c. 1129) was an influential Benedictine theologian, exegete and writer on liturgical and musical topics.

== Life ==
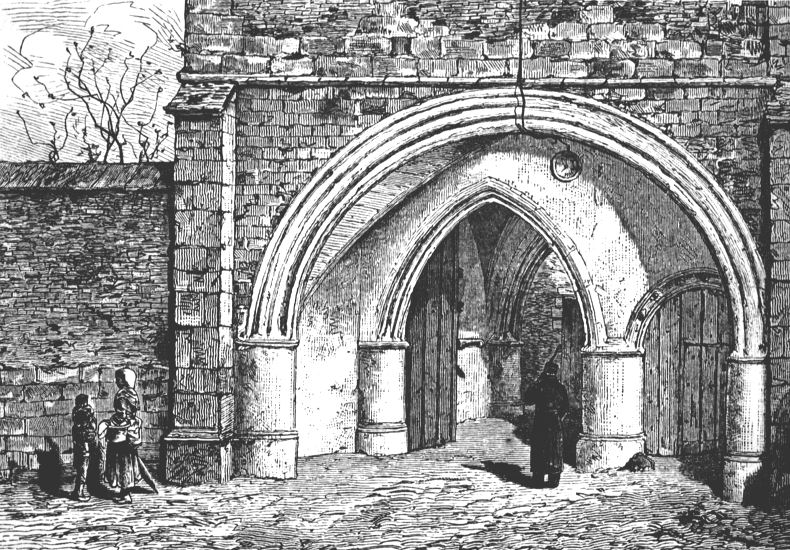
Gatehouse of the Abbey of Saint-Laurent, Liège, ca 1870

Rupert was most likely born in or around Liège in the years 1075-1080, and there, as was the custom, was brought by his family as an oblate to the Benedictine abbey of Saint-Laurent in Liège, which already a generation earlier had become a notable centre of learning, including mathematics, hagiography, and poetry. There Rupert eventually made monastic profession and was educated under the capable Abbot, Berengar.

In 1092, in the context of the conflict between the papacy and the Empire, known as the Investiture Controversy, which in Germany encompassed nearly 50 years of civil war (1076-1122), Rupert joined other monks in following their abbot, Berengar, into exile in northern France, from where he returned in 1095. According to differing sources, around 1106 or 1109 he was ordained a priest by the Bishop of Liège, Otbert, a powerful figure, and a close supporter of Emperor Henry IV.

While the minor works of Rupert's youth seem to have largely perished, it was from shortly after his priestly ordination, about the year 1110, that he began producing an immense volume of surviving writings, which were widely known to his contemporaries, and though in some quarters they were not without influence, they also won him strong opposition.

It was apparently because of this theological opposition that around 1116 Rupert underwent another exile (1116-1117), to the Abbey of Michaelsberg, Siegburg, where the Abbot was Cuno. In 1119, partly for the same reasons, there came a third exile, first to Siegburg and then to Cologne, and lastly in 1120 Frederick I, Archbishop of Cologne, appointed him abbot of the monastery of St Heribert in Deutz, founded in 1003 but later named for Saint Heribert, Archbishop of Cologne, who had died in 1021 and been buried in the abbey church. Deutz is now a suburb of Cologne.

== Theologian and Musician ==
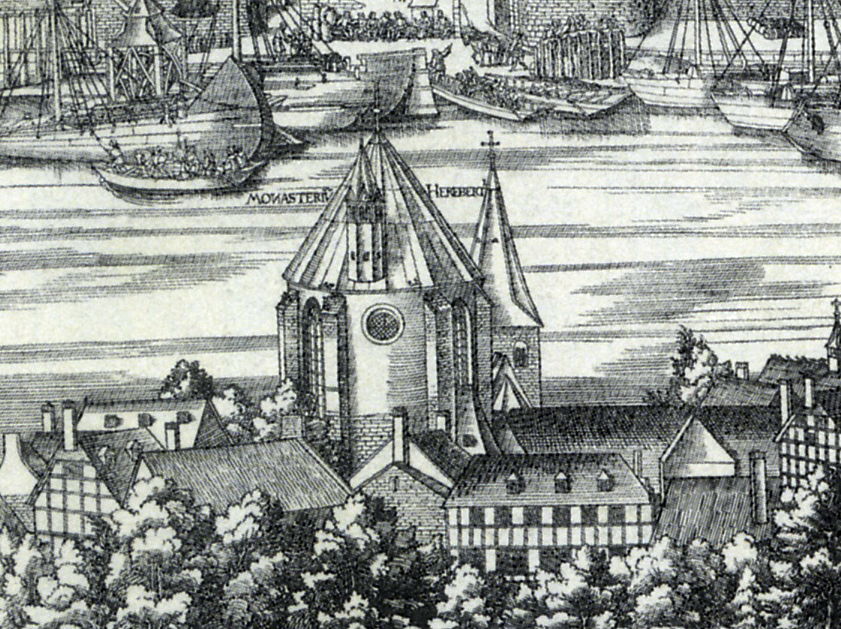
Woodcut of Deutz Abbey, ca. 1530

At Deutz, Rupert emerged as a prominent theologian, and from surviving manuscripts, it would seem that he was a prolific writer, his works taking up four volumes in Patrologia Latina (vols. 167–170). These works demonstrate among other things his familiarity with the disciplines of the trivium and quadrivium of medieval education in the liberal arts and his acquaintance with the Scriptures.

The main works include:

- De voluntate Dei
- De omnipotentia Dei
- Commentaria in Canticum canticorum
- De divinis Officiis
- De Victoria Verbi Dei
- De Gloria et Honore Filii Hominis super Mattheum
- De Trinitate et operibus eius, written around 1112–1116.
- De glorificatione Trinitatis et processione Spiritus sancti, written in 1128.

Of these works, the most widely known was his De divinis officiis, which dealt with the liturgy and includes observations on plainchant. Other of his theological writings lead to his entering into controversy with Anselm of Laon and Anselm’s disciple William of Champeaux, later to be the master of Peter Abelard. Other works, such as Rupert’s De Trinitate, also incidentally offer treatments on music, and it is possible that at Liège he studied music under a monk called Heribrand. Rupert himself makes mention of a hymn he wrote to the Holy Spirit. Moreover, it is thought that in his youth he wrote others in honour of St Heribert, as also of St Mary Magdalene, St Goar and St Severinus.

His writings were later scrutinized in relation with the doctrine of impanation, a Eucharistic heresy from the point of view of the Catholic Church because, contrary to the dogma of transubstantiation wherein the substance (but not the appearances and physical characteristics) of the bread and wine is seen as being wholly converted into the substance of Christ's Body and Blood, united to his divine Person, impanation maintains that Christ directly unites the substance of the bread and wine to his divine person (or sometimes to his human nature), just as he united his own body and blood to his divine Person. They influenced the theology in particular of Honorius Augustodunensis and Gerhoch of Reichersberg.

Abbot Rupert died in Deutz on March 4, 1129.

== Editions of the Latin Text of the Works ==
- De victoria verbi Dei, Anton Sorg, Augsburg, 1487.
- R.D.D. Ruperti Abbatis Monasterij S. Heriberti Tuitiensis Ordinis D. Benedicti, Viri longe doctissimi, summiq[ue] inter veteres theologi, Opera, Quotquot hactenus haberi potuerunt, auctiora quam antea. Cum Duobus Indicibus: priore rerum et verborum posteriore locorum S. Scripturae, Mylius, Moguntiae 1631. Digital reproduction.
- Jacques Paul Migne (ed.), Patrologia Latina, tomes 167-170.
- Rhabanus Maurus Haacke (ed.), Rupertus Tuitiensis: Liber de divinis officiis, Turnholti, 1967 (= Corpus Christianorum, Continuatio Medievalis 7).
- Rhabanus Maurus Haacke (ed.), Rupertus Tuitiensis: Commentaria in Evangelium sancti Iohannis, Turnholti, 1969 (= Corpus Christianorum, Continuatio Medievalis 9).
- Rhabanus Maurus Haacke (ed.), Rupert Rupert von Deutz, 'De Victoria Verbi Dei' , Weimar, 1970 (= Monumenta Germaniae Historica: Quellen zur Geistesgeschichte des Mittelalters 5).
- Rhabanus Maurus Haacke (ed.), Rupertus Tuitiensis: De sancta Trinitate et operibus eius I, Turnholti, 1971 (= Corpus Christianorum, Continuatio Medievalis 21).
- Rhabanus Maurus Haacke (ed.), Rupertus Tuitiensis: De sancta Trinitate et operibus eius II, Turnholti, 1972 (= Corpus Christianorum, Continuatio Medievalis 22).
- Rhabanus Maurus Haacke (ed.), Rupertus Tuitiensis: De sancta Trinitate et operibus eius III, Turnholti, 1972 (= Corpus Christianorum, Continuatio Medievalis 23).
- Rhabanus Maurus Haacke (et alii, edd.), Rupertus Tuitiensis: De sancta Trinitate et operibus eius; De operibus Spiritus sancti, Turnholti, 1972 (= Corpus Christianorum, Continuatio Medievalis 24).
- Rhabanus Maurus Haacke (ed.), Rupertus Tuitiensis: Commentaria in Canticum canticorum, Turnholti, 1974 (= Corpus Christianorum, Continuatio Medievalis 26).
- Maria Lodovica Arduini (ed.), Rupertus Tuitiensis: Opera apologetica, Turnholti, 2013 (= Corpus Christianorum, Continuatio Medievalis 28).
- Rhabanus Maurus Haacke (ed.), Rupertus Tuitiensis: De gloria et honore Filii hominis. Super Mattheum, Turnholti, 1979 (= Corpus Christianorum, Continuatio Medievalis 29).
- Alessio Magoga (ed.), Rupertus Tuitiensis: Anulus seu dialogus de sacramentis fidei, Turnhout, 2020 (= Corpus Christianorum, Continuatio Medievalis 299).
