= Schnütgen Museum =

Museum of medieval Christian religious art in Cologne, Germany

Coordinates: 50°56′06″N 6°57′05″E

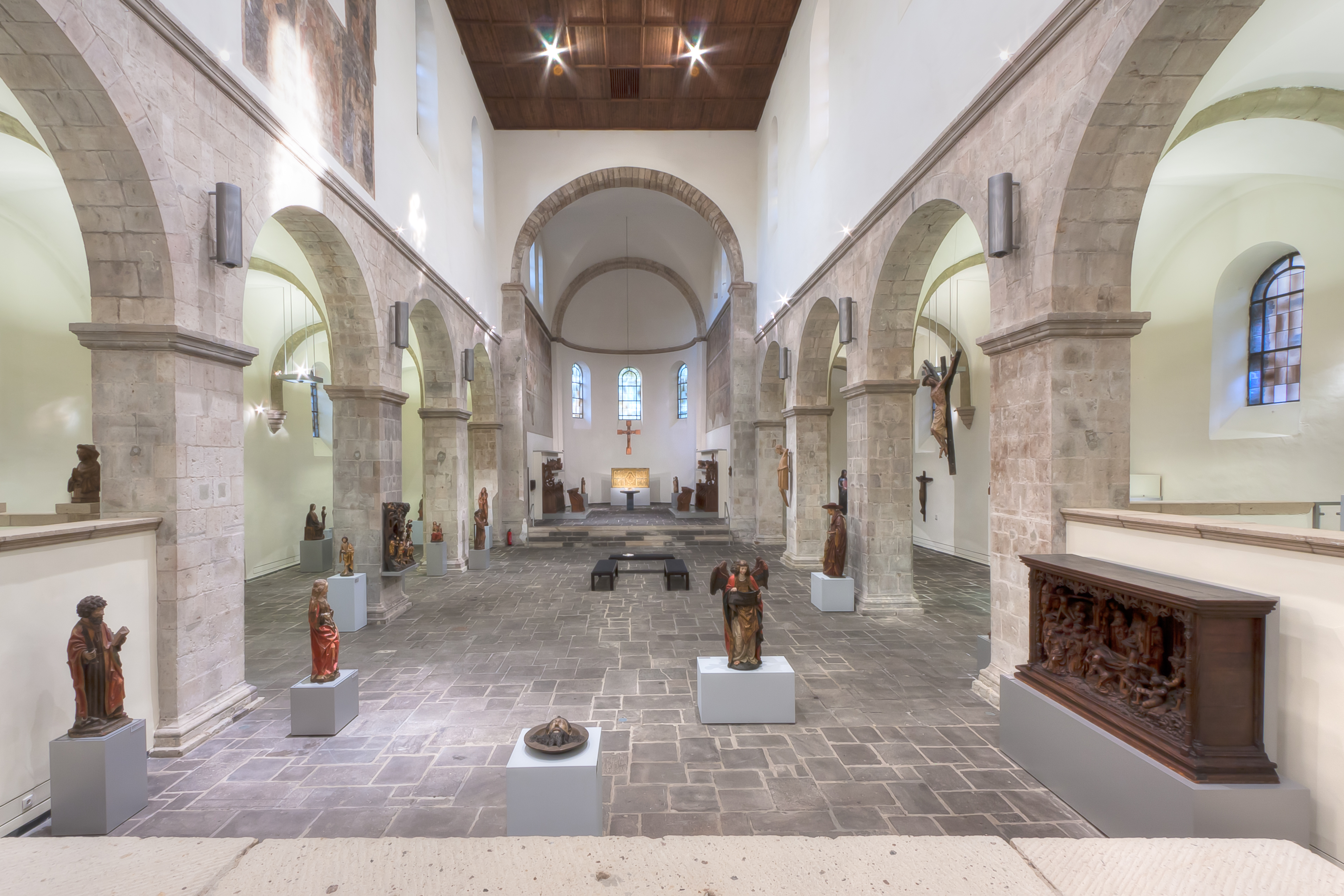
The choir of St Cecilia's

Schnütgen Museum, Cologne

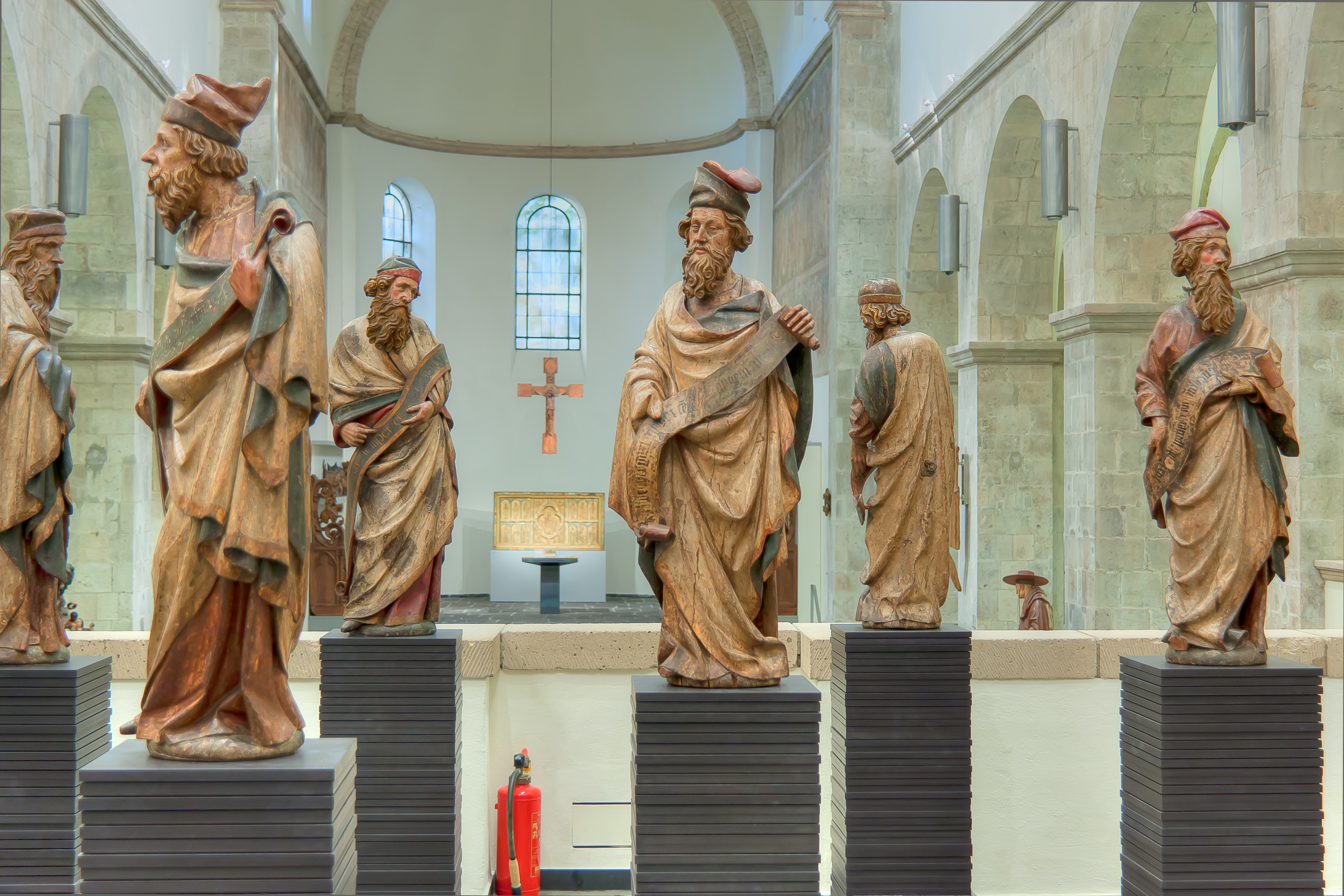
Sculptures in the museum

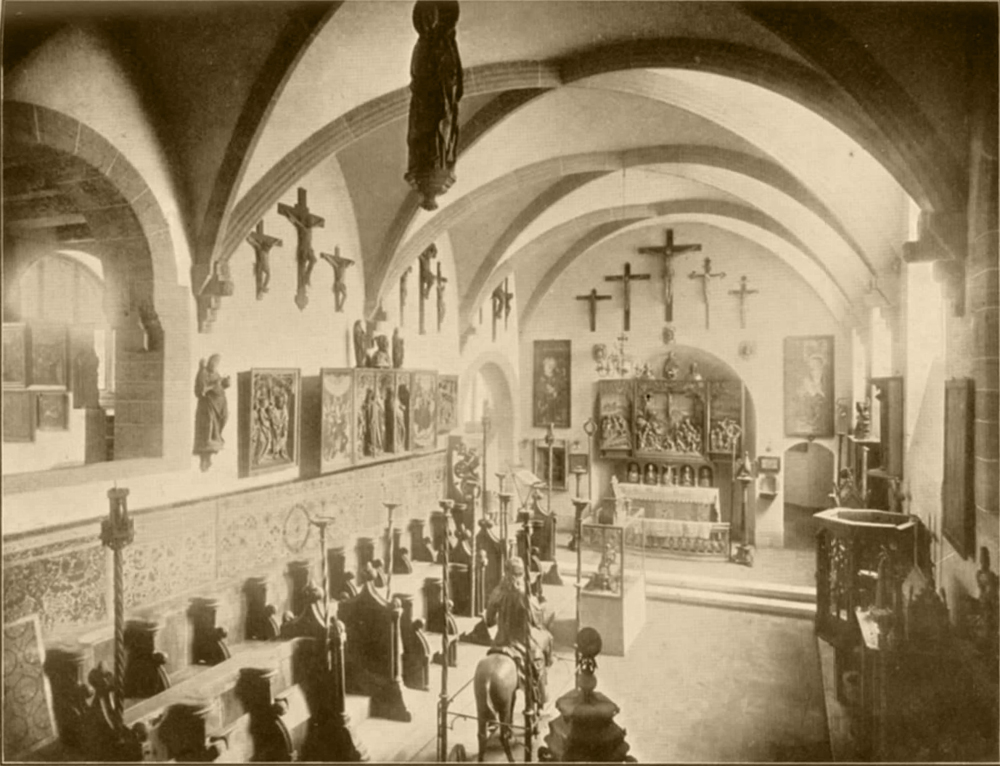
The museum's previous quarters in 1910

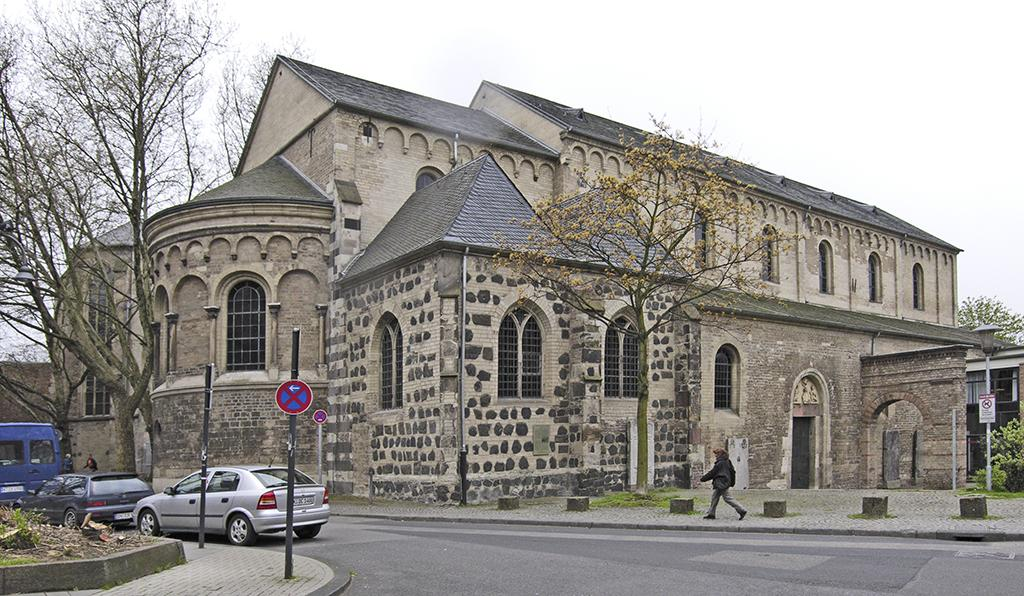
Exterior of the museum

The Schnütgen Museum (Museum Schnütgen in German) in Cologne is devoted to Christian religious art, mainly medieval, but some parts of the collection, such as its textiles and prints, extend from antiquity to the modern period. In 1906, the collection of Alexander Schnütgen was donated to the city, and the collection has continued to expand, so that until the opening of a new building in 2010, only about 10% of its 13,000 items could be displayed. Now some 2,000 objects are on display in 1900 sq. metres of gallery space, with an additional 1300 sq. metres for special exhibitions. Schnütgen (1843–1918) was a Catholic priest and theologian; according to the museum website "Up to now people tell stories about his zealous and sometimes crafty collection tactics".

Since 1956, the museum has occupied the large Romanesque church of St. Cäcilien, founded in 881 for noble canonesses, with the present building dating from 1130–60, with murals from about 1300. An annex built by architect Karl Band was added in the 1950s, and new buildings (part of the Kulturquartier, “Culture quarter“) opened in 2010. Highlights of the collection include a Romanesque tympanum from St Cecilia's itself, several large wooden crucifixes, including the 11th century Cross of St George's, as well as a large collection of early bronze ones, including the only other work generally attributed to Rainer of Huy apart from his Liège baptismal font. The museum has a late Carolingian evangeliary of 860–880, and a single leaf from the English St Albans Psalter. The "Comb of St Heribert" is a 9th-century ivory liturgical comb, and the "Harrach Diptych" a Carolingian ivory of about 810 (on loan from the Ludwig collection). Ivories, stained glass, textiles including vestments, metalwork and paintings are all well represented.

Alexander Schnütgen had organised influential exhibitions of his collection while it was still private, and from the 1970s the museum (using extra exhibition spaces) organized a series of landmark exhibitions of medieval art:

- Rhein und Maas (1972, Mosan art)
- Monumenta Annonis – Köln und Siegburg. Weltbild und Kunst im hohen Mittelalter (1975)
- Die Parler und der schöne Stil 1350–1400, Europäische Kunst unter den Luxemburgern (1978)
- Ornamenta Ecclesia – Kunst und Künstler der Romanik (1985, Romanesque metalwork and other church art)
- Himmelslicht. Europäische Glasmalerei im Jahrhundert des Kölner Dombaus (1248–1349) (1998, stained glass).

The enormous catalogues for these exhibitions, some running to three volumes, remain important works of reference. Catalogues of the permanent collection of the museum are being published in several volumes. A touring exhibition in America of objects from the museum in 2000 also produced a catalogue in English.
