= Deutz Abbey =

Benedictine monastery in Westphalia, Germany

- Kloster
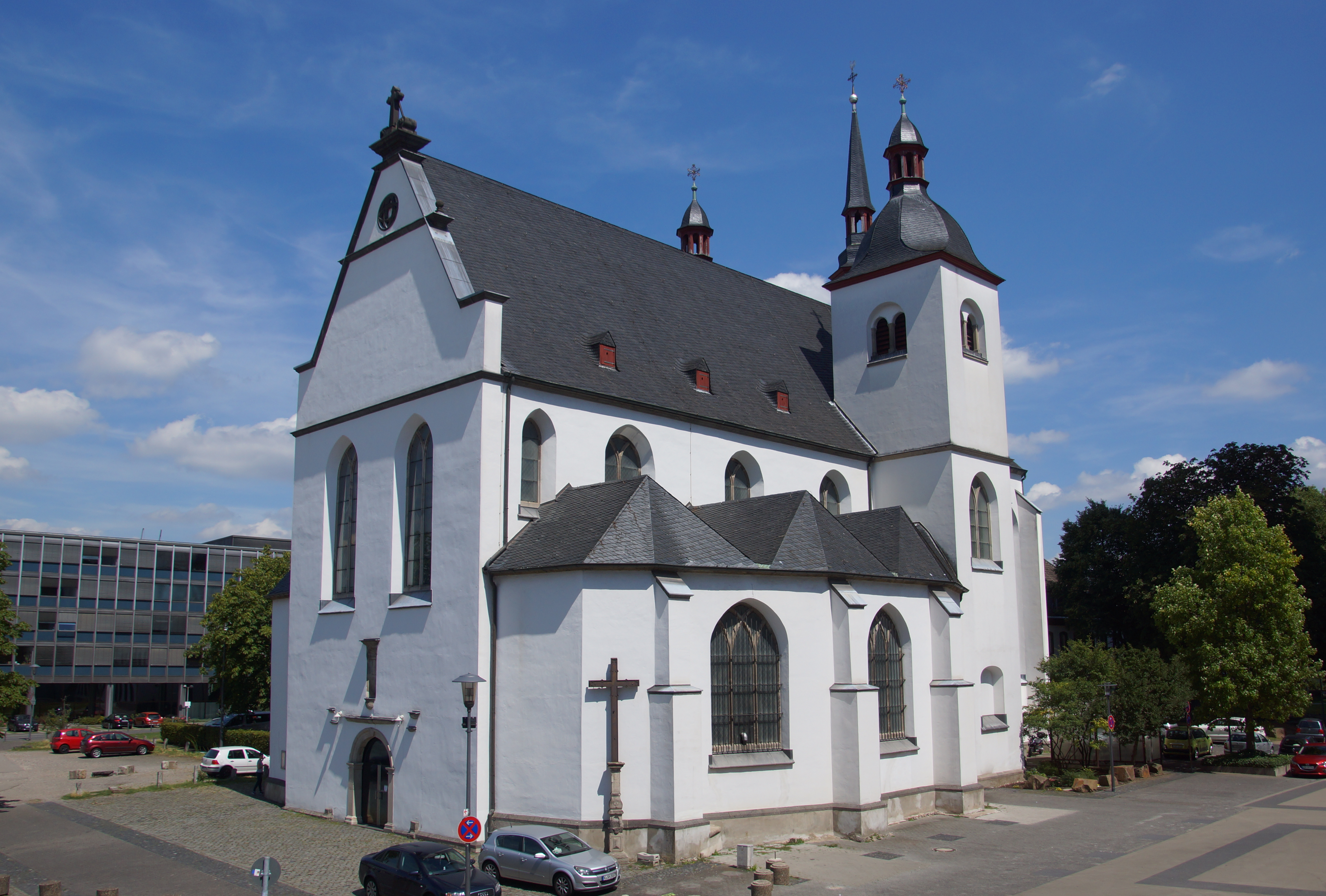
- Alt St. Heribert

- Location within North Rhine-Westphalia Location within Germany

Religion
- Affiliation: Catholic
- Sect: Benedictines

Location
- Location: Deutz
- Country: Germany
- Coordinates: 50°56′17″N 6°58′11″E

Architecture
- Completed: 1003

Deutz Abbey (German: Kloster or Abtei Deutz) was a Benedictine monastery located at Deutz, now part of Cologne as Köln-Deutz, North Rhine-Westphalia, Germany.

It was founded in 1003 on the site of a Roman fort by the future Saint Heribert, Archbishop of Cologne, close adviser of Emperor Otto III. Heribert died in 1021 and was buried in the Romanesque church he had had built here. The theologian Rupert of Deutz was abbot during the 1120s.

The abbey had extensive properties, but its strategic position by the Rhine exposed it to involvement in fighting, and it was destroyed in the 14th century and again in the 16th. It was dissolved during the secularisation of the Napoleonic era, but the abbey church, now known as Alt St. Heribert, became a parish church in 1804.

In World War II it was heavily damaged and only the ground floor and remnants of the Romanesque cellar were preserved. Reconstruction took place in the 1970s. Today the former abbey accommodates an old people's home run by Caritas. Notable are the mural paintings by the artist Werner Weber. The former abbey church of Alt St. Heribert is now used by the Greek Orthodox community of Cologne, and has been superseded as a Roman Catholic parish church by Neu St. Heribert, which now houses the shrine of Saint Heribert.

== Bibliography ==
- Sinderhauf, Monica, 1996. Die Abtei Deutz und ihre innere Erneuerung. Klostergeschichte im Spiegel des verschollenen Codex Thioderici. Vierow: Veröffentlichungen des Kölnischen Geschichtsvereins.
