= St. Cecilia's Church, Cologne =

Romanesque church in Cologne, Germany

Coordinates: 50°56′6″N 06°57′5″E

St. Cecilia's Church
- Cäcilienkirche
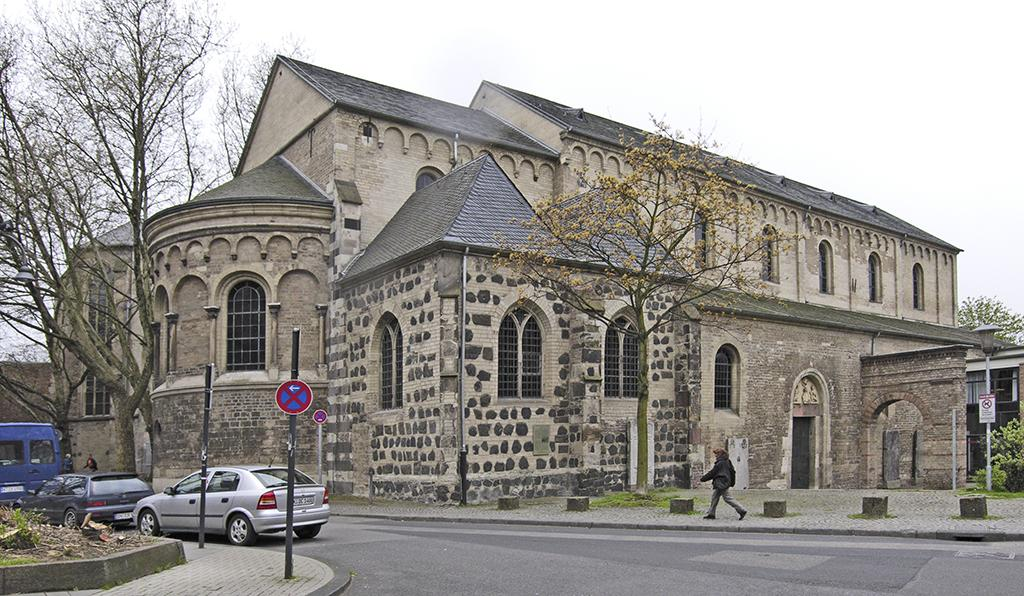

Religion
- Affiliation: Roman Catholic
- Region: Cologne
- Ecclesiastical or organisational status: Parish church
- Status: Schnütgen Museum (occasionally active church)

Location
- State: North Rhine-Westphalia
- Interactive map of St. Cecilia's Church

Architecture
- Type: Church
- Style: Romanesque

St. Cecilia's Church (German: Cäcilienkirche) is one of the twelve Romanesque churches in Cologne's old city, maintained by the Foundation of Romanesque Churches in Cologne. The present building, little changed since its inception, dates from 1130-60. Since 1956, the church has been the home of the Schnütgen Museum for medieval art.

== Building description ==
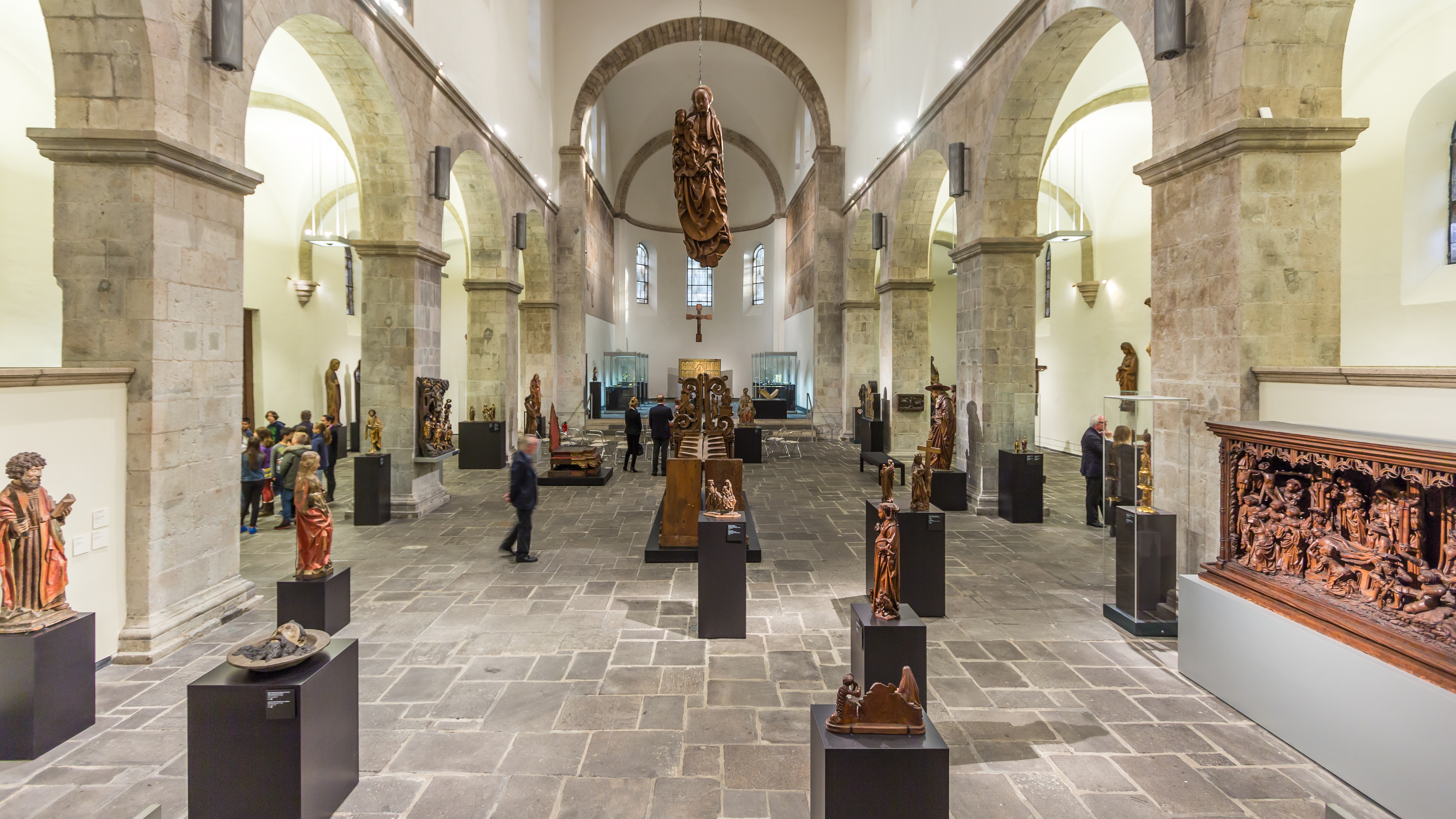
Interior view of St. Cäcilien

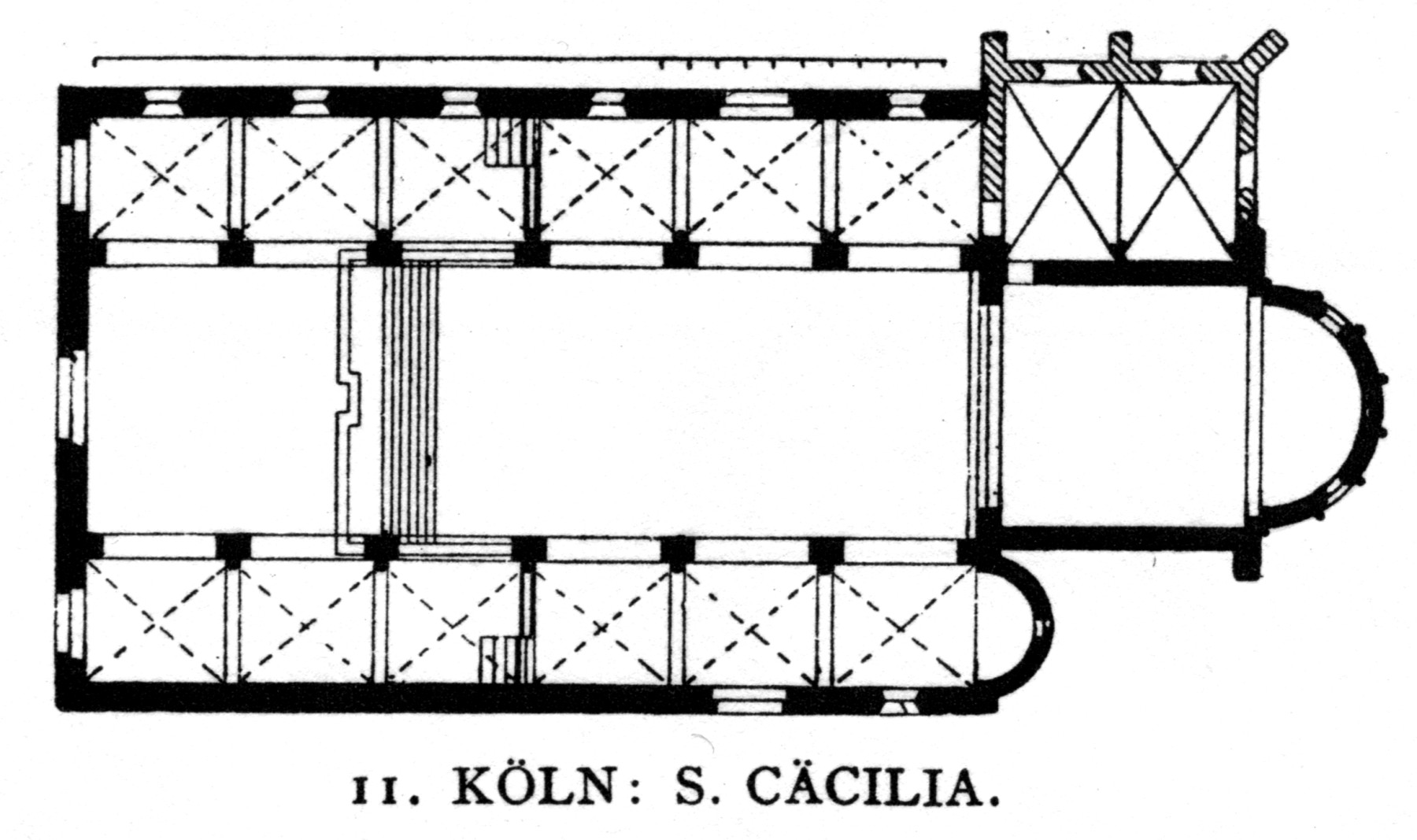
Floorplan of St. Cäcilien

The floorplan of Saint Cecilia's is that of a simple, three-aisled church without towers or transepts. The southernmost aisle and the centre of the nave end in a rounded apse. The northern aisle ends in an apse used as a sacristy, built in 1479. In the upper choir of the middle aisle are frescoes, difficult to see clearly, that were damaged during world war two. The original, arched wooden roof in the middle aisle remains on the site. and the tympanum dates from 1160, which can be viewed as part of the museum’s collection. A copy of it can be seen from outside, at the north entrance.

== History ==
The origin of the church building stems from the 9th century, during which a women’s home of the same name was founded at the site, during the reign of Archbishop Willibert in 870-888. It was built on the ruins of a prior Roman bath. Previously, it was suggested that the first Cologne Cathedral stood at the site, but archaeological evidence has since ruled out this possibility. From documentation of the home in 965, it is known that Bruno the Great, archbishop of Cologne, designated 50 pounds of silver for the completion of the church building. The original was renovated in the 12th century to suit a romanesque style, and distinguishes itself from the other Romanesque churches in Cologne through its relatively modest size and decoration.

Through resources originally designated for another church, the interior of St Cecilia's was renovated during the late 15th century. The main entrance was also changed in the 19th century, and given a new entry in the Neo-Romantic style. It remains on site, but is now walled up to suit the needs of the Schnütgen Museum.

For a time, the building was also adjacedent to the first hospital in Cologne, for which the church offered services as a chapel. The hospital is no longer present, as the Church now stands next to the Rautenstrauch-Joest Museum.

Though it is currently used mainly as museum of medieval art, the church celebrates two masses each year, one at Christmas and the other on the feast day of St. Cecilia.

== See also ==
- Cologne Cathedral
- German architecture
- Romanesque architecture
- List of regional characteristics of Romanesque churches
- Romanesque secular and domestic architecture
