= Hiltrud Kier =

Austrian art historian

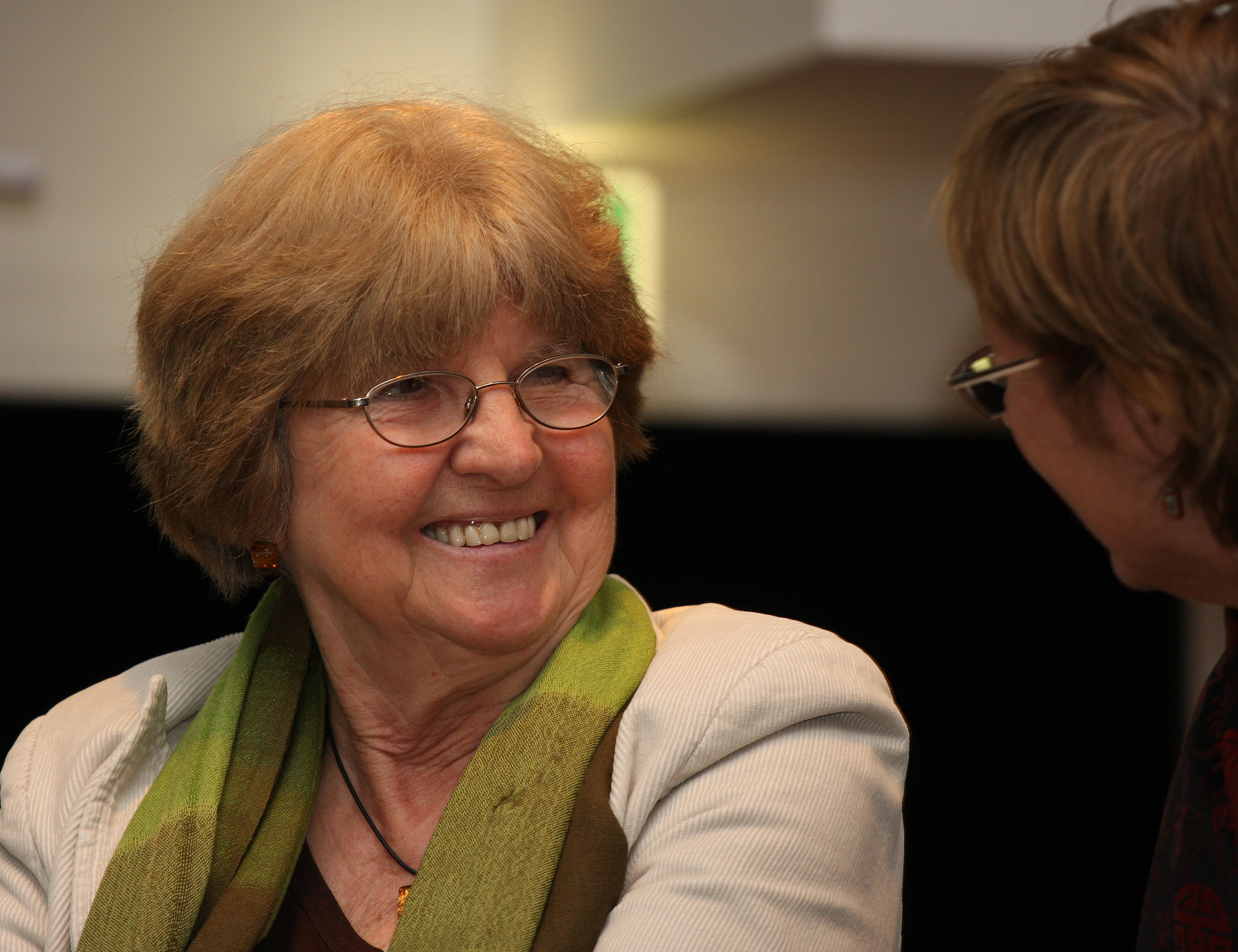

Hiltrud Kier (née Arnetzl; born 30 June 1937) is an Austrian art historian and academic. She was city conservator to Cologne and Director General of the city's museums, with her term including the Year of Romanesque Churches in 1985, and Cologne’s twelve most significant Romanesque churches were preserved and restored. She made historic preservation accessible to a broad audience and championed, among other things, buildings from the 1950s.

== Career ==
Hiltrud Arnetzl studied art history, with musicology and classical archaeology as minors, in Vienna (1956–1959) and Cologne (1959–1968). She completed her studies in 1969 with a Dr. phil. degree, receiving the grade summa cum laude for her doctoral thesis “Der mittelalterliche Schmuckfußboden” (The Medieval Ornate Floor). In 1968, Hiltrud Kier had became a founding member of the Ulmer Verein, a group of young art historians that had split off from the established Verband Deutscher Kunsthistoriker (Association of German Art Historians).

After completing an internship in 1968–69 she was awarded a research grant by the German Research Foundation (DFG) from 1970 to 1972 to conduct scholarly research on „Schmuckfußböden in Renaissance und Barock“ (Ornate Floors in the Renaissance and Baroque Periods). This was followed, from 1973 to 1976, by a fellowship from the Fritz Thyssen Foundation to study Cologne’s Neustadt, as well as a contract with the City of Cologne from 1976 to 1978 to compile an inventory of buildings worthy of preservation—which later became Cologne’s list of historic monuments.

Kier served as City Conservator of Cologne from August 1, 1978, to November 30, 1990, succeeding Fried Mühlberg. In 1981 she initiated the foundation of the Förderverein Romanische Kirchen (Friends of the Romanesque Churches of Cologne) and was elected vice chair. At the end of 1990, she took over from Hugo Borger as Director General of the City of Cologne’s Museums and as head of Cologne’s Archaeological Heritage Preservation Office. Disagreements with museum directors led to her resignation from the position as Director General in 1993; she was transferred to the newly created position of Head of the Department of Scientific Research at the Cologne Museums, a post she held until 1997.

In addition, Kier has been an honorary professor at the Institute of Art History at the University of Bonn since 1988, a role she took on more intensively after 1997 and which she still holds (as of 2026). Furthermore, she served as an active board member of the Verband Deutscher Kunsthistoriker (1988–1997), as a board member of the Architektur Forum Rheinland (2002–2008), and again as a board member of the Fördervereins Romanische Kirchen Köln. As of 2026, Kier is the second vice chair of the Friends of the FrauenMediaTurm, an organization founded in 2024 that is dedicated to preserving the archive of feminism in Cologne.

== Personal life ==
Hiltrud Kier has been married to musicologist Herfrid Kier since 1959; she is the mother of four children and lives in Zülpich.

== Awards ==
- Honorary plaque of the Architekten- und Ingenieur-Vereins Köln (1982)
- Order of Merit of the Federal Republic of Germany, Cross of Merit (1983)
- Rheinlandtaler, Landschaftsverband Rheinland (2013)
- Honorary chair of the Fördervereins Romanische Kirchen Köln e.V. (2026)

== Selected publications ==
=== Works as author: ===
- Der mittelalterliche Schmuckfussboden unter besonderer Berücksichtigung des Rheinlandes, 1970
- Schmuckfussböden in Renaissance und Barock, 1976
- Die Kölner Neustadt: Planung, Entstehung, Nutzung, 1978
- Die romanischen Kirchen in Köln, 1985
- Architektur der 50er Jahre: Bauten des Gerling-Konzerns in Köln, 1994
- Gotik in Köln, Köln 1997
- Kirchen in Köln, Köln 2000
- Köln (Reclams Städteführer), 3rd revised and updated edition, 2018

=== Works as editor ===
- Lust und Verlust: Kölner Sammler zwischen Trikolore und Preussenadler, 1995
- Architektur der 30er und 40er Jahre in Köln (Publications of the NS Documentation Centre of the City of Cologne 5), 1999 (with Karen Liesenfeld and Horst Matzerath)
- Moderner Sakralbau in Köln, 2025 (with Martin Struck)

An overview of all publications can be found on the University of Bonn's profile page.
