= Basilica of St. Cunibert, Cologne =

St. Cunibert
- Pfarrkirche St. Kunibert
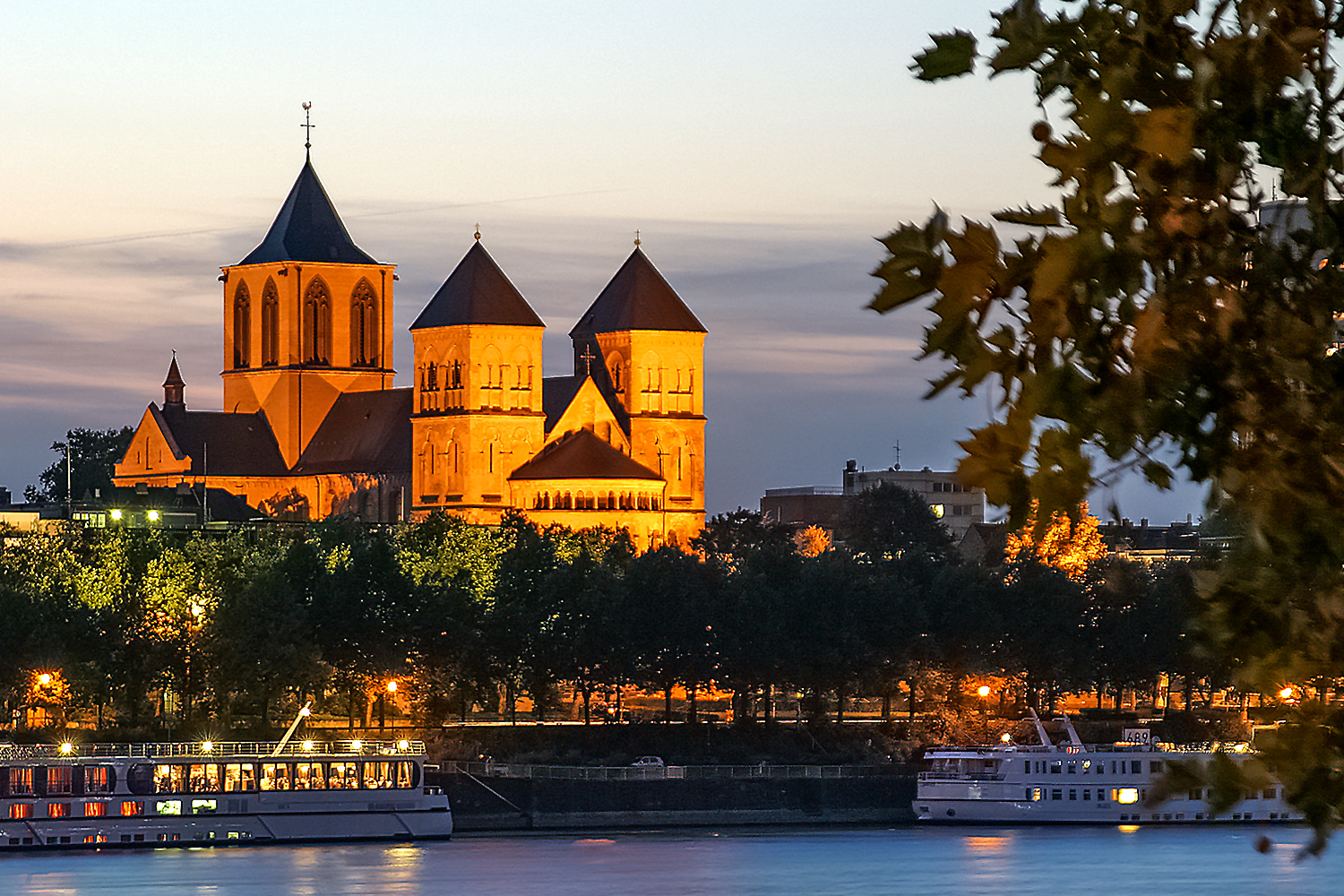
- View of church from Rhine
- St. Cunibert
- 50°56′48″N 6°57′45″E
- Location: Innenstadt, Cologne
- Country: Germany
- Denomination: Catholic
- Website: www.romanische-kirchen-koeln.de

The Basilica of St. Cunibert or St. Kunibert (German: [ˌzaŋkt ˈkuːnibɛʁt], Colognian: [ˌtsɪ̂nt ˈkʊ̂nɪbɛːt]) is the last of Cologne's twelve Romanesque churches to be built. It was consecrated in 1247, one year before work on the Gothic Cologne Cathedral began. It was declared a minor basilica in 1998 by Pope John Paul II.

== History ==
A small church located at a burial ground north of the Roman city Colonia Claudia Ara Agrippinensium was founded or renewed by Cunibert, ninth Bishop of Cologne. Cunibert was also buried there. After 690, the Two Ewalds were buried in the church as well.

The church was originally dedicated to Saint Clement, but Cunibert has been venerated alongside him since at least the ninth century, and a monastery called Saint Kunibert appears in records as far back as 866. Around the middle of the eleventh century, the direct predecessor of the current church was built. Later, a parish with the dean as parson was allocated to the monastery. The church became a pilgrimage site after the Canonization of the Two Ewalds in 1074 and of Cunibert in 1168.

Between 1210 and 1215 the erection of the current building started. The choir was finished 1226 and the church consecrated in 1247. Until 1261, a transept and a tower were added to the west.

The monastery ceased to exist in 1802 as a result of the secularization under Napoleonic reign and the monastery buildings were eventually torn down in 1821. However, the church remained in use by the local parish.

The western spire collapsed during a storm in 1830 for static reasons, as this tower was not part of the original plan and the structure of the building was not designed for it. Tower and westwork were newly erected until 1860.

The church suffered severe damage during the Second World War. The roof was destroyed by fire, the western tower was hit by a bomb, collapsed, causing significant damage to the large parts of the westwork. The reconstruction of choir and nave was finished in 1955; however, the rebuilding of the transept and western tower did not begin until the late 1970s. Reconstruction work was finished in 1985.

== Furnishing ==
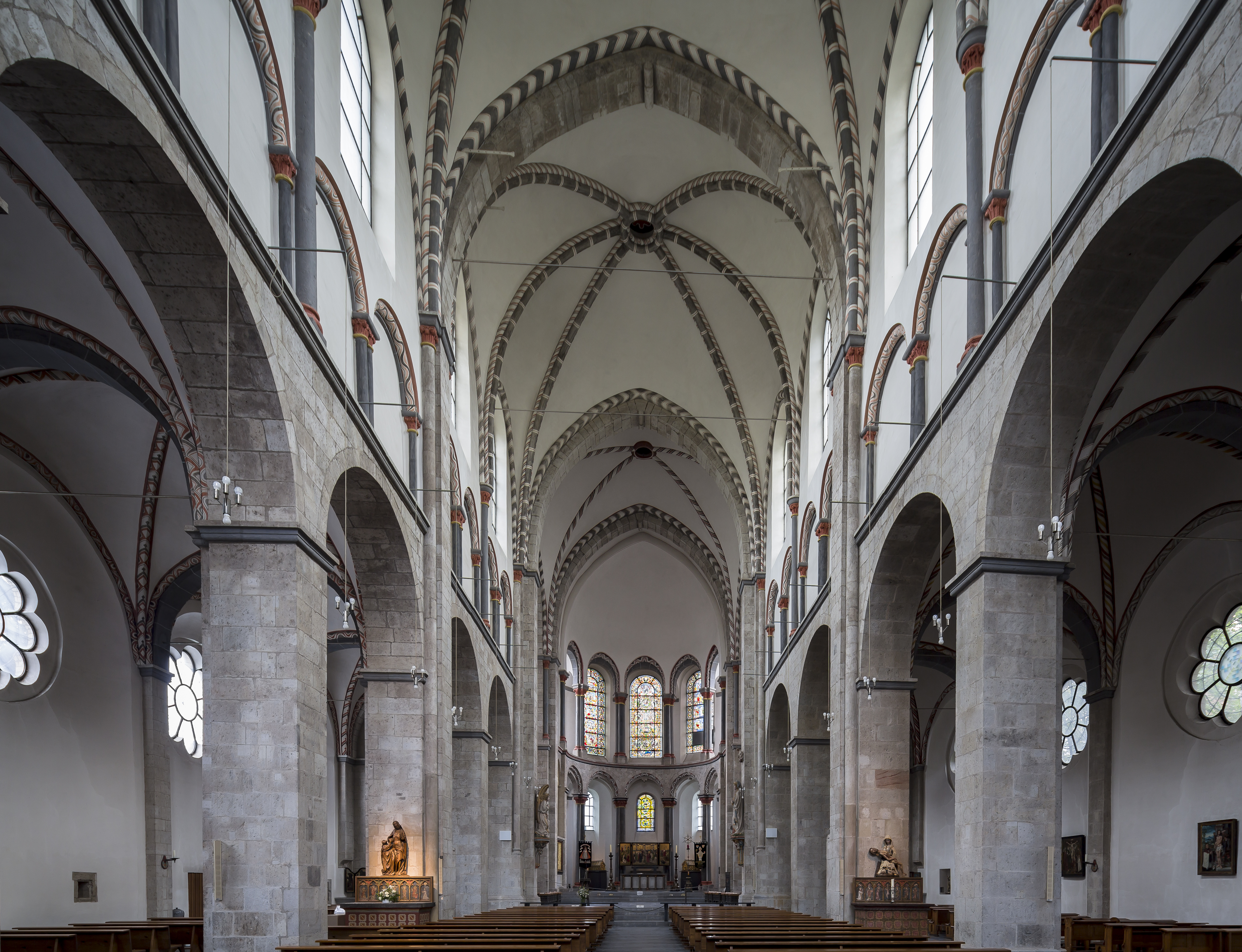
Interior

The original shrines of Cunibert and The Ewalds were destroyed during secularization and only the wooden cores with the relics remained. Today's shrines are from the second half of the 19th century.

The eight medieval glass windows in the apse area were made between 1220 and 1230. The upper three windows show Saint Clement, the original patron of the site, the Tree of Jesse and Saint Cunibert. The windows of the lower band show Saint Ursula, Saint Cordula, Saint Catherine, Saint Cecilia and John the Baptist.

== See also ==
- Twelve Romanesque churches of Cologne
- Cologne Cathedral
- German architecture
- Romanesque architecture
- List of regional characteristics of Romanesque churches
- Romanesque secular and domestic architecture

== Literature ==
- Hiltrud Kier: Via Sacra zu Fuß, Kölns Städtebau und die Romanischen Kirchen. Bachem Verlag, Köln 2003 (²/2005) ISBN 3-7616-1704-6.
- Ulrich Krings, Otmar Schwab: Köln: Die Romanischen Kirchen – Zerstörung und Wiederherstellung. Reihe Stadtspuren Bd. 2, Köln, Bachem Verlag, 2007 (712 S. mit CD Chronologie des Wiederaufbaus).
- Sybille Fraquelli: Zwölf Tore zum Himmel. Kinder entdecken: Die Romanischen Kirchen in Köln. J.P. Bachem Verlag, Köln 2007. ISBN 978-3-7616-2148-6
- Hiltrud Kier und Ulrich Krings: Die Romanischen Kirchen in Köln, Köln, 3.Auflage 1986.
- Sabine Czymmek: Die Kölner Romanischen Kirchen, Schatzkunst, Bd. 1, Köln 2008, Bd. 2, Köln 2009 (= Colonia Romanica, Jahrbuch des Fördervereins Romanische Kirchen Köln e. V. Bd. 22, 2007 und 23, 2008)
