= Babinet =

Babinet is a surname. Notable people with the surname include:

- Gilles Babinet (born 1967), French entrepreneur
- Jacques Babinet (1794–1872), French scientist
- Rémi Babinet (born 1957), French creative director

== Other uses ==
- Babinet–Soleil compensator
- Babinet's principle, physics theorem
