= Jules Duboscq =

French photographer and inventor (1817–1886)

Louis Duboscq
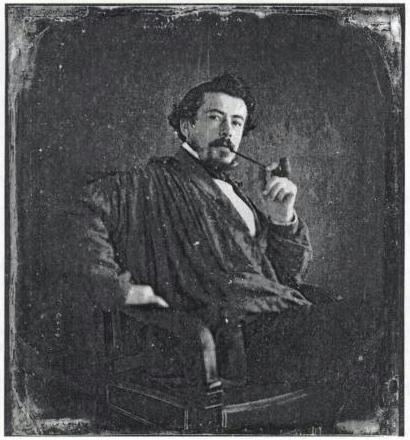
- Photograph of Duboscq
- Born: Louis Jules Duboscq; March 5, 1817; Villaines-sous-Bois, Seine-et-Oise, France
- Died: September 24, 1886 (aged 69)

Louis Jules Duboscq (March 5, 1817 – September 24, 1886) was a French instrument maker, inventor, and pioneering photographer. He was known in his time, and is remembered today, for the high quality of his optical instruments.

== Life and work ==
Duboscq was born at Villaines-sous-Bois (Seine-et-Oise) in 1817. He was apprenticed in 1834 to Jean-Baptiste-François Soleil (1798–1878), a prominent instrument maker, and he married one of Soleil's daughters, Rosalie Jeanne Josephine, in 1839.

Among the instruments Duboscq built were a stereoscope (marketing David Brewster's lenticular stereoscope), a colorimeter, a polarimeter, a heliostat and a saccharimeter.

== See also ==
- Colorimetry (chemical method)
