= Albertus Magnus =

German Dominican friar and saint (c. 1200 – 1280)

Saint Albertus Magnus OP
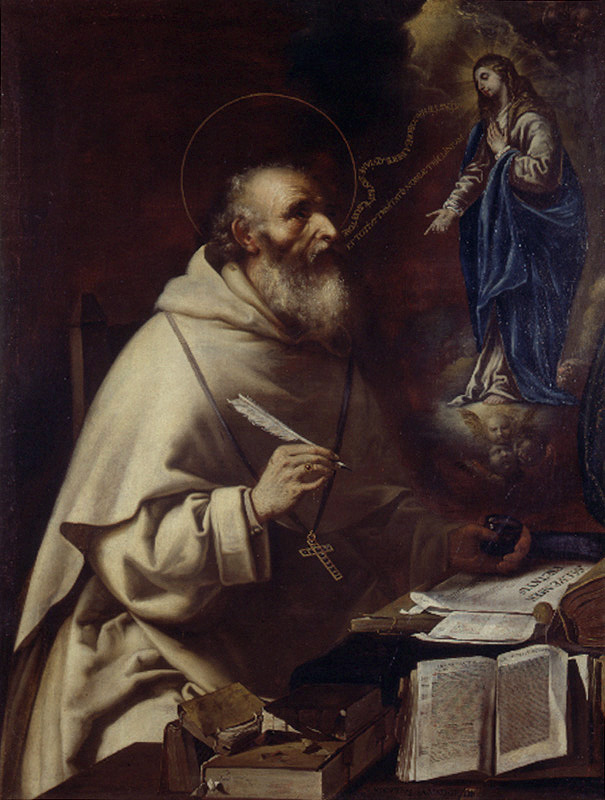
- The Apparition of the Virgin to Saint Albert the Great by Vicente Salvador Gomez

Bishop of Regensburg Doctor of the Church
- Born: c. 1200; Lauingen, Duchy of Bavaria, Holy Roman Empire
- Died: 15 November 1280; Cologne, Electorate of Cologne, Holy Roman Empire
- Venerated in: Catholic Church
- Beatified: 1622, Rome, Papal States by Pope Gregory XV
- Canonized: 16 December 1931, Vatican City by Pope Pius XI
- Major shrine: St. Andrew's Church, Cologne
- Feast: 15 November
- Attributes: Dominican habit, mitre, book, and quill
- Patronage: Those who cultivate the natural sciences, medical technicians, philosophers, and scientists
- Scientific career
- Other names: Albertus Teutonicus, Albertus Coloniensis, Albert the Great, Albert of Cologne
- Education: University of Padua
- Known for: Teaching of theology Pioneering scholar of Aristotle; Systematic study of minerals Discovery of the element arsenic
- Fields: Natural science; Alchemy; Jurisprudence; Diplomacy; Theology; Natural philosophy
- Academic advisors: Guerric of Saint-Quentin

Philosophical work
- Era: Medieval philosophy
- Region: Western philosophy
- School: Scholasticism; Aristotelianism; Medieval realism
- Institutions: University of Paris
- Notable students: Thomas Aquinas
- Main interests: Philosophy; physiology; mineralogy; astrology; geography; astronomy; music theory; natural science; alchemy; jurisprudence; diplomacy; theology; natural philosophy
- Notable ideas: Natural law; Aevum

Ecclesiastical career
- Religion: Christianity
- Church: Catholic Church
- Offices held: Bishop of Regensburg

Albertus Magnus (Note: Latin: Albertus Teutonicus, Albertus Coloniensis) (c. 1200 – 15 November 1280), also known as Saint Albert the Great, Albert of Swabia, Albert von Bollstadt, or Albert of Cologne, was a German Dominican friar, philosopher, scientist, and bishop. He is considered one of the greatest medieval philosophers and thinkers.

Canonized in 1931, he was known during his lifetime as Doctor universalis and Doctor expertus; late in his life the sobriquet Magnus was appended to his name. Scholars such as James A. Weisheipl and Joachim R. Söder have referred to him as the greatest German philosopher and theologian of the Middle Ages. The Catholic Church distinguishes him as one of the Doctors of the Church.

== Biography ==
It seems likely that Albertus Magnus was born sometime before 1200, given well-attested evidence that he was aged over 80 on his death in 1280. Two later sources say that Albert was about 87 on his death, which has led 1193 to be commonly given as the date of Albert's birth, but this information does not have enough evidence to be confirmed. Albert was probably born in Lauingen (now in Bavaria), since he called himself 'Albert of Lauingen', but this might simply be a family name. Most probably his family was of ministerial class; his familial connection with the Bollstädt noble family (being son of the count) is almost certainly mere conjecture by 15th-century hagiographers.

Albert was probably educated principally at the University of Padua, where he received instruction in Aristotle's writings. A late account by Rudolph de Novamagia refers to Albertus' encounter with the Blessed Virgin Mary, who convinced him to enter Holy Orders. In 1223 (or 1229), he became a member of the Dominican Order, and studied theology at Bologna and elsewhere. Selected to fill the position of lecturer at Cologne, Germany, where the Dominicans had a house, he taught for several years there, as well as in Regensburg, Freiburg, Strasbourg, and Hildesheim. During his first tenure as lecturer at Cologne, Albert wrote his Summa de bono after having a discussion with Philip the Chancellor concerning the transcendental properties of being. In 1245, Albert became master of theology under Guerric of Saint-Quentin, the first German Dominican to achieve this distinction. Following this turn of events, Albert was able to teach theology at the University of Paris as a full-time professor, holding the seat of the Chair of Theology at the College of St. James. During this time Thomas Aquinas began to study under Albertus.

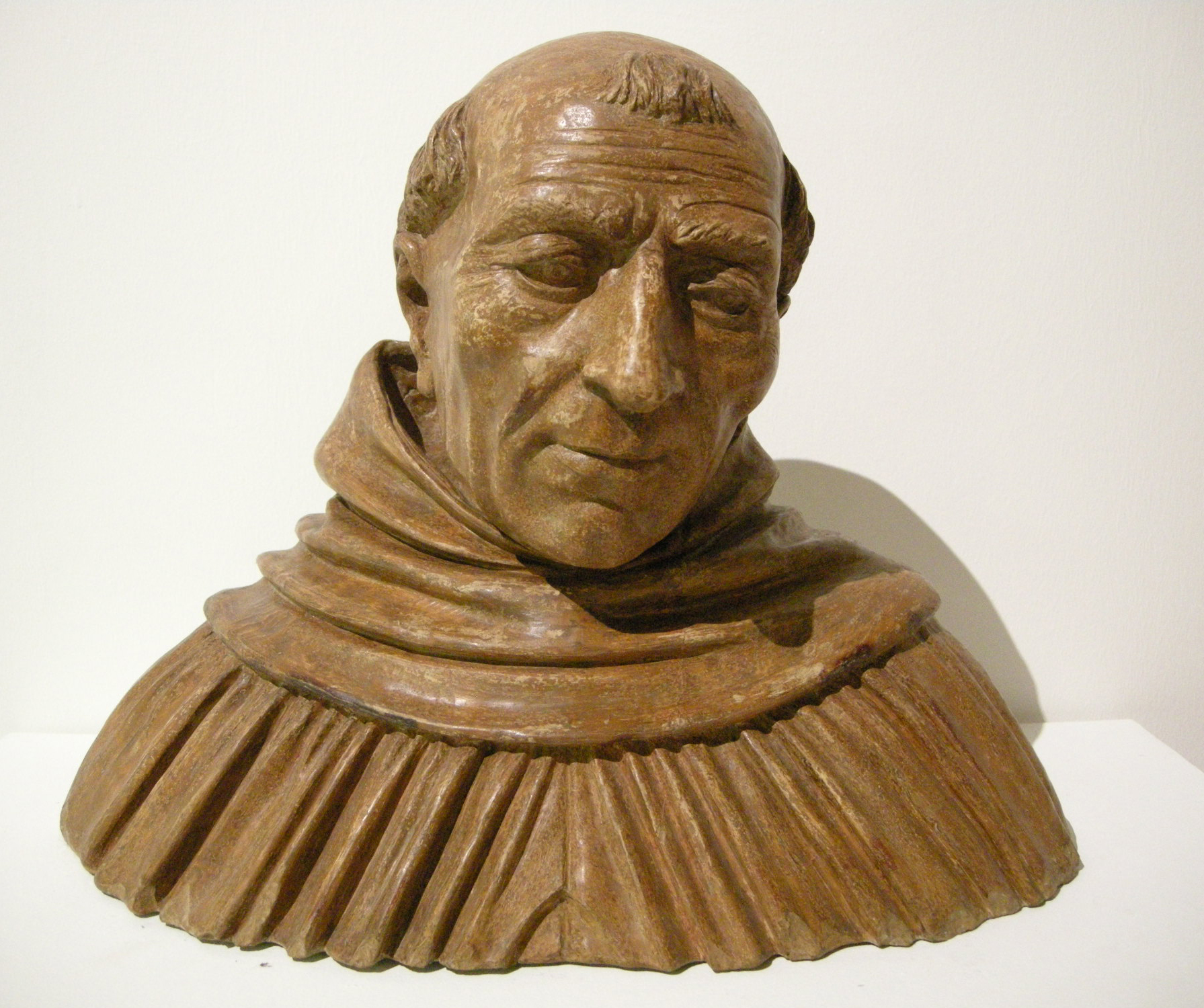
Bust of Albertus Magnus by Vincenzo Onofri, c. 1493

Albert was the first to comment on virtually all of the writings of Aristotle, thus making them accessible to wider academic debate. The study of Aristotle brought him to study and comment on the teachings of Muslim academics, notably Avicenna and Averroes, and this would bring him into the heart of academic debate.

In 1254, Albert was made provincial of the Dominican Order and fulfilled the duties of the office with great care and efficiency. During his tenure, he publicly defended the Dominicans against attacks by the secular faculty of the University of Paris, commented on John the Evangelist, and answered what he perceived as errors of the Islamic philosopher Averroes.

In 1259, Albert took part in the General Chapter of the Dominicans at Valenciennes together with Thomas Aquinas, masters Bonushomo Britto, Florentius, and Peter (later Pope Innocent V), establishing a ratio studiorum or program of studies for the Dominicans that featured the study of philosophy as an innovation for those not sufficiently trained to study theology. This innovation initiated the tradition of Dominican scholastic philosophy put into practice, for example, in 1265 at the Order's studium provinciale at the convent of Santa Sabina in Rome, out of which would develop the Pontifical University of Saint Thomas Aquinas, the "Angelicum".

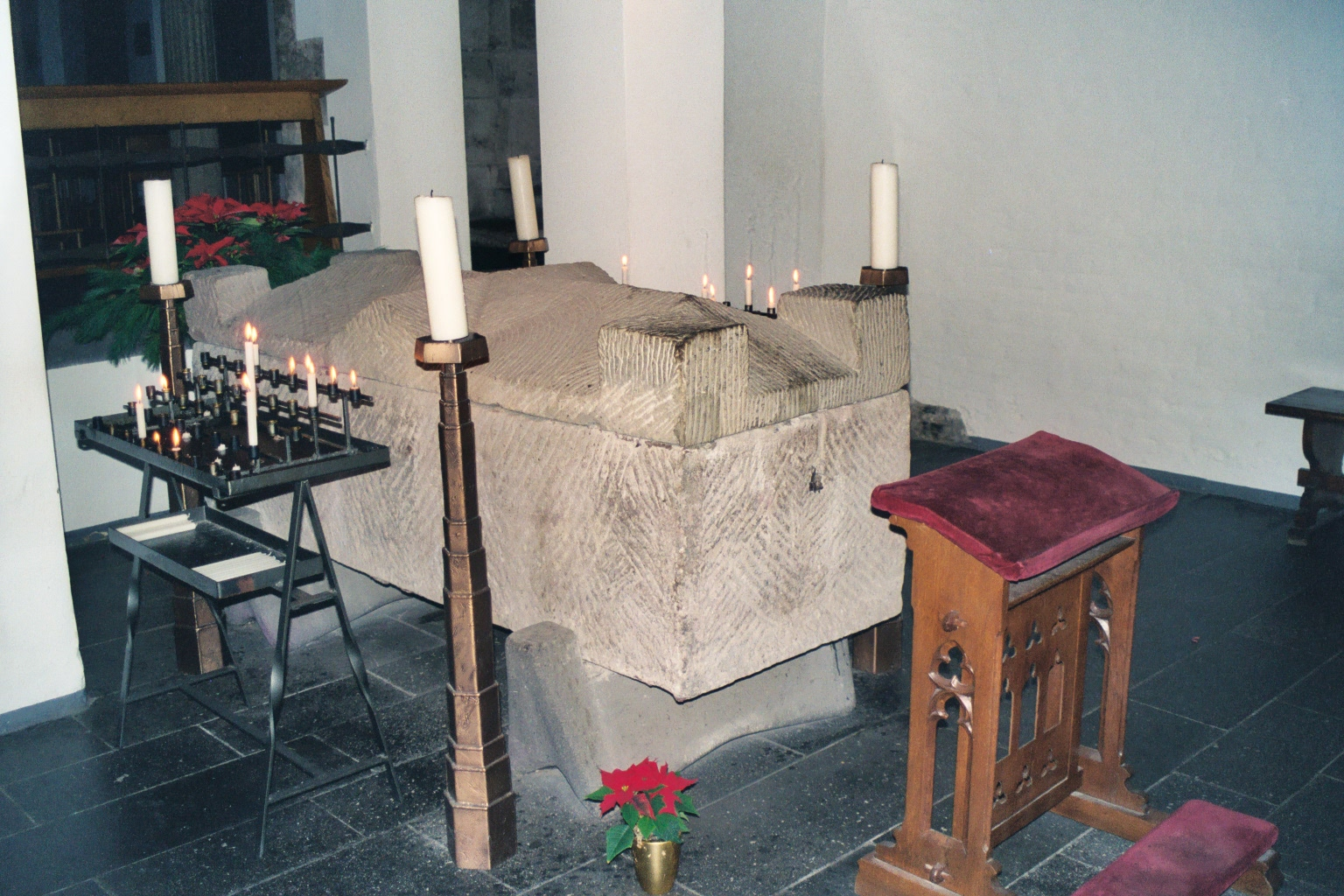
Roman sarcophagus containing the relics of Albertus Magnus in the crypt of St. Andrew's Church, Cologne, Germany

In 1260, Pope Alexander IV made him bishop of Regensburg, an office from which he resigned after three years. During the exercise of his duties he enhanced his reputation for humility by refusing to ride a horse, in accord with the dictates of the Order, instead traversing his huge diocese on foot. In 1263, Pope Urban IV relieved him of the duties of bishop and asked him to preach the Eighth Crusade in German-speaking countries. After this, he was especially known for acting as a mediator between conflicting parties. In Cologne, he is known not only for being the founder of one of Germany's oldest universities there, but also for "the big verdict" (der Große Schied) of 1258, which brought an end to the conflict between the citizens of Cologne and the archbishop. Among the last of his labors was the defense of the orthodoxy of his former pupil, Thomas Aquinas, whose death in 1274 grieved Albert (the story that he travelled to Paris in person to defend the teachings of Aquinas can not be confirmed).

Albert was a scientist, philosopher, astrologer, theologian, spiritual writer, ecumenist, and diplomat. Under the auspices of Humbert of Romans, Albert molded the curriculum of studies for all Dominican students, introduced Aristotle to the classroom and probed the work of Neoplatonists, such as Plotinus. Indeed, it was the thirty years of work done by Aquinas and himself that allowed for the inclusion of Aristotelian study in the curriculum of Dominican schools.

After suffering declining health in 1278, he died on 15 November 1280 in the Dominican convent in Cologne, Germany. His relics are located in a Roman sarcophagus in the crypt of the Dominican St. Andrew's Church in Cologne. His body was claimed to be incorrupt during an exhumation three years after his death. However, a later exhumation in 1483 found that only a skeleton remained. The Saint Stephen's Church in Nijmegen, the Netherlands, also houses a relic.

Albert was beatified in 1622. He was canonized and proclaimed a Doctor of the Church on 16 December 1931 by Pope Pius XI and the patron saint of natural scientists in 1941. St. Albert's feast day is 15 November.

Among the first biographical sources, there were Heinrich von Herford and Luis of Valladolid_{es} and, in modern times, the study by James A. Weisheipl (1980), who reconstructs the life and works of Albertus Magnus taking into account all previous biographies and places his date of birth around 1200.

== Writings ==
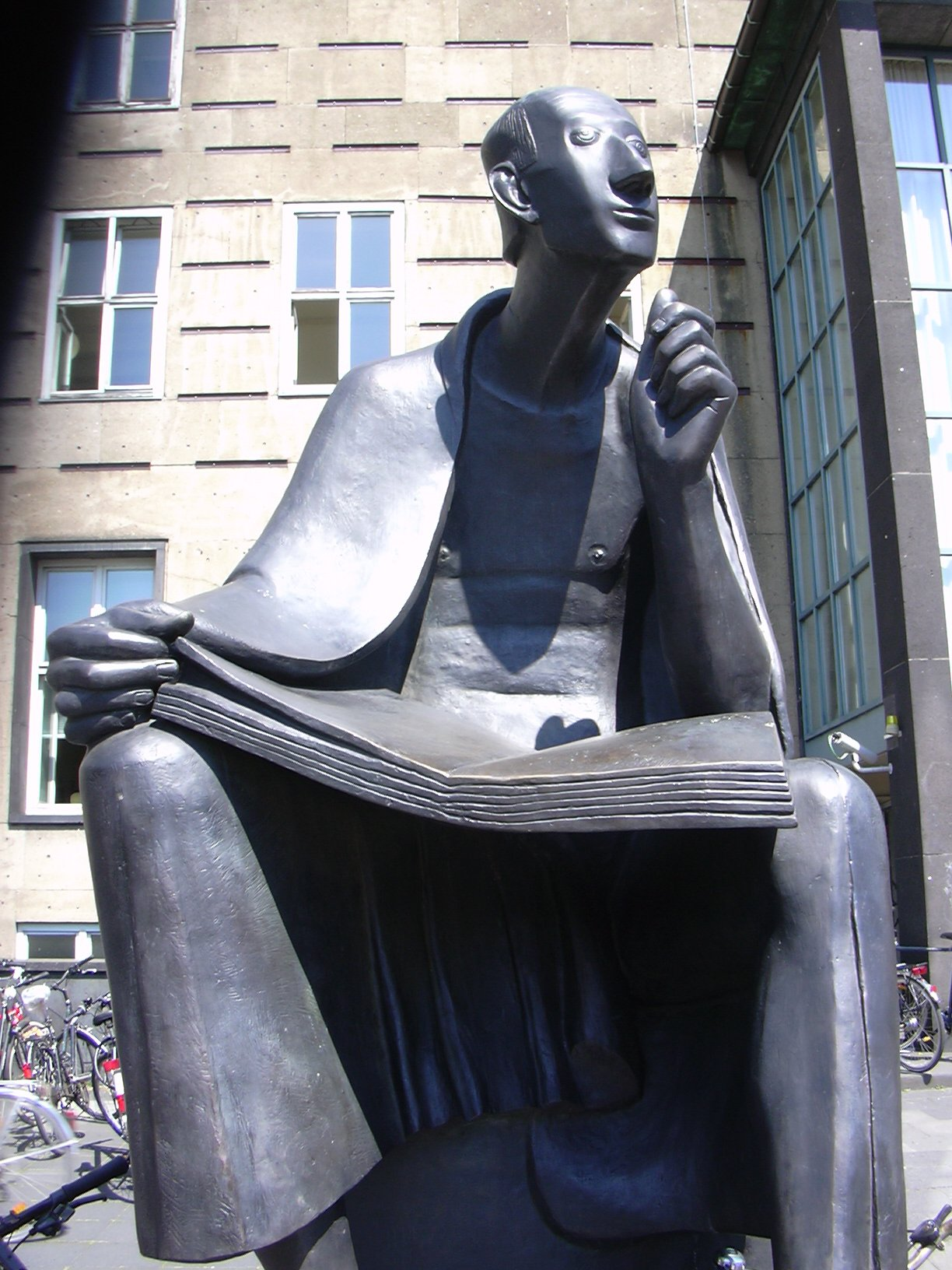
Albertus Magnus monument at the University of Cologne

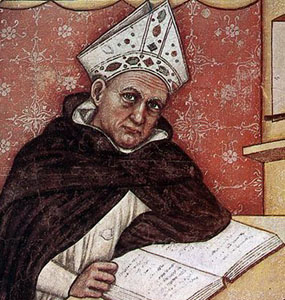
Saint Albertus Magnus, a fresco by Tommaso da Modena (1352), Chapter hall of convent of St. Nicholas, Treviso, Italy

Albert's writings collected in 1899 went to thirty-eight volumes. These displayed his prolific habits and encyclopedic knowledge of topics such as logic, theology, botany, geography, astronomy, astrology, mineralogy, alchemy, zoology, physiology, phrenology, justice, law, friendship, and love. He digested, interpreted, and systematized the whole of Aristotle's works, gleaned from the Latin translations and notes of the Arabian commentators, in accordance with Church doctrine. Most modern knowledge of Aristotle was preserved and presented by Albert.

His principal theological works are a commentary in three volumes on the Books of the Sentences of Peter Lombard (Magister Sententiarum), and the Summa Theologiae in two volumes. The latter is in substance a more didactic repetition of the former.

Albert's activity, however, was more philosophical than theological (see Scholasticism). The philosophical works, occupying the first six and the last of the 21 volumes, are generally divided according to the Aristotelian scheme of the sciences, and consist of interpretations and condensations of Aristotle's relative works, with supplementary discussions upon contemporary topics, and occasional divergences from the opinions of the master. Albert believed that Aristotle's approach to natural philosophy did not pose any obstacle to the development of a Christian philosophical view of the natural order.

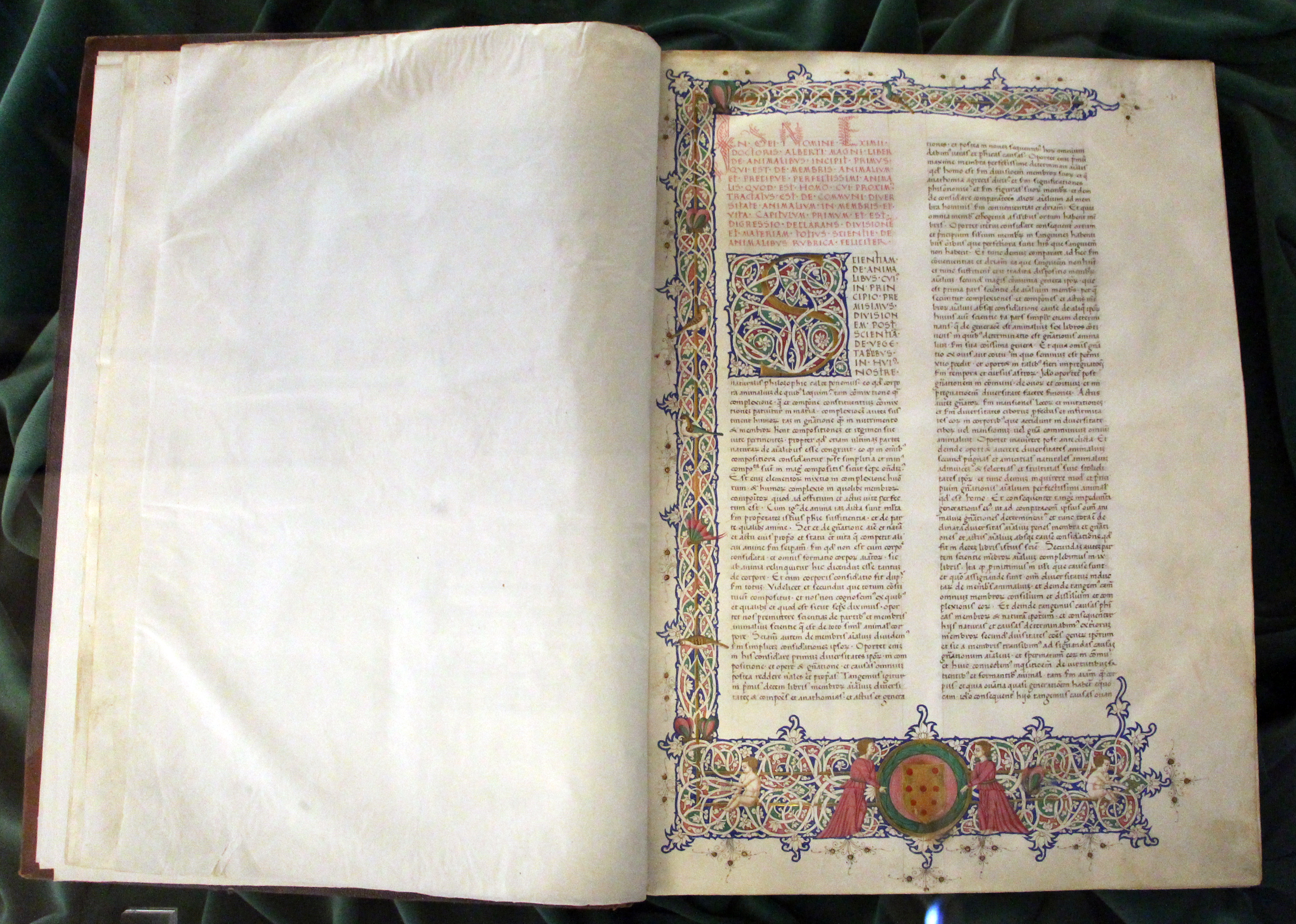
De animalibus (c. 1450–1500, cod. fiesolano 67, Biblioteca Medicea Laurenziana)

Albert's knowledge of natural science was considerable and for the age remarkably accurate. His industry in every department was great: not only did he produce commentaries and paraphrases of the entire Aristotelian corpus, including his scientific works, but Albert also added to and improved upon them. His books on topics like botany, zoology, and minerals included information from ancient sources, but also results of his own empirical investigations. These investigations pushed several of the special sciences forward, beyond the reliance on classical texts. In the case of embryology, for example, it has been claimed that little of value was written after Aristotle until Albert, who managed to identify organs within eggs. Furthermore, Albert also effectively invented entire special sciences, where Aristotle has not covered a topic. For example, prior to Albert, there was no systematic study of minerals. For the breadth of these achievements, he was bestowed the name Doctor Universalis.

Much of Albert's empirical contributions to the natural sciences have been superseded, but his general approach to science may be surprisingly modern. For example, in De Mineralibus (Book II, Tractate ii, Ch. 1) Albert claims, "For it is [the task] of natural science not simply to accept what we are told but to inquire into the causes of natural things."

=== Alchemy ===
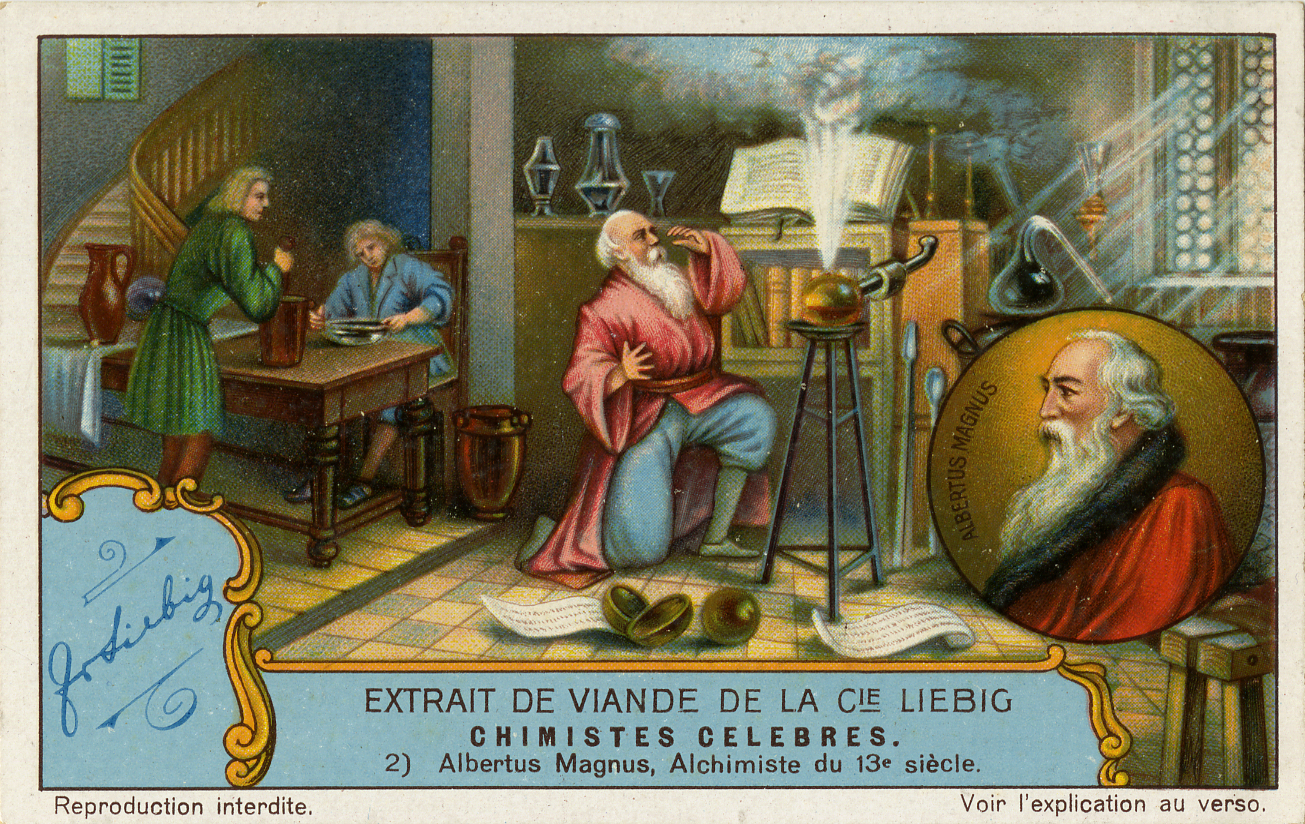
Albertus Magnus, Chimistes Celebres, Liebig's Extract of Meat Company Trading Card, 1929

In the centuries since his death, many stories arose about Albert as an alchemist and magician. "Much of the modern confusion results from the fact that later works, particularly the alchemical work known as the Secreta Alberti or the Experimenta Alberti, were falsely attributed to Albertus by their authors to increase the prestige of the text through association." On the subject of alchemy and chemistry, many treatises relating to alchemy have been attributed to him, though in his authentic writings he had little to say on the subject, and then mostly through commentary on Aristotle. For example, in his commentary, De mineralibus, he refers to the power of stones, but does not elaborate on what these powers might be. A wide range of Pseudo-Albertine works dealing with alchemy exist, though, showing the belief developed in the generations following Albert's death that he had mastered alchemy, one of the fundamental sciences of the Middle Ages. These include Metals and Materials; the Secrets of Chemistry; the Origin of Metals; the Origins of Compounds, and a Concordance which is a collection of Observations on the philosopher's stone; and other alchemy-chemistry topics, collected under the name of Theatrum Chemicum. He is credited with the discovery of the element arsenic and experimented with photosensitive chemicals, including silver nitrate. He did believe that stones had occult properties, as he related in his work De mineralibus. However, there is scant evidence that he personally performed alchemical experiments.

According to legend, Albert is said to have discovered the philosopher's stone and passed it on to his pupil Thomas Aquinas, shortly before his death. Albert does not confirm he discovered the stone in his writings, but he did record that he witnessed the creation of gold by "transmutation." Given that Thomas Aquinas died six years before Albert's death, this legend as stated is unlikely.

=== Astrology ===
Albert was deeply interested in astrology, as has been articulated by scholars such as Paola Zambelli and Scott Hendrix. Throughout the Middle Ages—and well into the early modern period—astrology was widely accepted by scientists and intellectuals who held the view that life on earth is effectively a microcosm within the macrocosm (the latter being the cosmos itself). It was believed that correspondence therefore exists between the two and thus the celestial bodies follow patterns and cycles analogous to those on earth. With this worldview, it seemed reasonable to assert that astrology could be used to predict the probable future of a human being. Albert argued that an understanding of the celestial influences affecting us could help us to live our lives more in accord with Christian precepts. The most comprehensive statement of his astrological beliefs is to be found in two separate works that he authored around 1260, known as the Speculum astronomiae and De Fato. However, details of these beliefs can be found in almost everything he wrote, from his early De natura boni to his last work, the Summa theologiae. His speculum was critiqued by Gerard of Silteo.

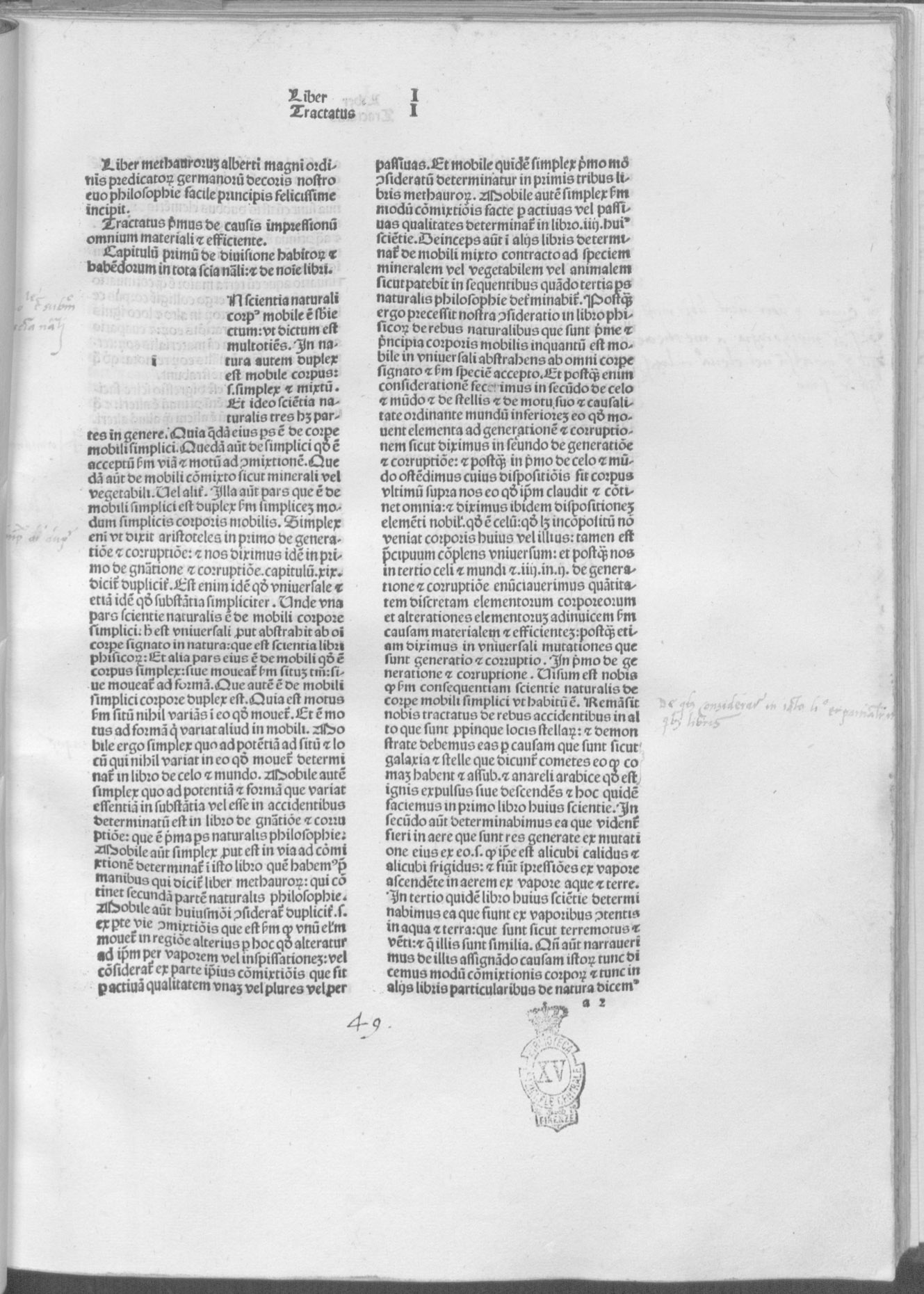
De meteoris, 1488

=== Tides and the Moon ===
Albert considered the tides to be influenced by the moon. Based on ancient Greek theories of light and Abu Ma'shar al-Balkhi's astrological explanations, he proposed a mixed theory where the Moon doubly attracts the water by its intrinsic astrological humid nature and by the heat that the moonlight produces.

=== Matter and form ===
Albert believed that all natural things were compositions of matter and form, to which he referred as quod est and quo est. Albert also believed that God alone is the absolute ruling entity. Albert's version of hylomorphism is very similar to the Aristotelian doctrine.

=== Music ===
Albert is known for his commentary on the musical practice of his times. Most of his written musical observations are found in his commentary on Aristotle's Poetics. He rejected the idea of "music of the spheres" as ridiculous: movement of astronomical bodies, he supposed, is incapable of generating sound. He wrote extensively on proportions in music, and on the three different subjective levels on which plainchant could work on the human soul: purging of the impure; illumination leading to contemplation; and nourishing perfection through contemplation. Of particular interest to 20th-century music theorists is the attention he paid to silence as an integral part of music.

=== Metaphysics of morals ===
Both of his early treatises, De natura boni and De bono, start with a metaphysical investigation into the concepts of the good in general and the physical good. Albert refers to the physical good as bonum naturae. Albert does this before directly dealing with the moral concepts of metaphysics. In Albert's later works, he says to understand human or moral goodness, the individual must first recognize what it means to be good and do good deeds. This procedure reflects Albert's preoccupations with neo-Platonic theories of good as well as the doctrines of Pseudo-Dionysius. Albert's view was highly valued by the Catholic Church and his peers.

=== Natural law ===
Albert devoted the last tractatus of De Bono to a theory of justice and natural law. Albert places God as the pinnacle of justice and natural law. God legislates and divine authority is supreme. Before his time, there had been no work specifically devoted to natural law written by a theologian or philosopher.

=== Friendship ===
Albert mentions friendship in his work, De bono, as well as presenting his ideals and morals of friendship in the very beginning of Tractatus II. Later in his life he published Super Ethica. With his development of friendship throughout his work it is evident that friendship ideals and morals took relevance as his life went on. Albert comments on Aristotle's view of friendship with a quote from Cicero, who writes, "friendship is nothing other than the harmony between things divine and human, with goodwill and love". Albert agrees with this commentary but he also adds in harmony or agreement. Albert calls this harmony, consensio, itself a certain kind of movement within the human spirit. Albert fully agrees with Aristotle in the sense that friendship is a virtue. Albert relates the inherent metaphysical contentedness between friendship and moral goodness. Albert describes several levels of goodness; the useful (utile), the pleasurable (delectabile) and the authentic or unqualified good (honestum). Then in turn there are three levels of friendship based on each of those levels, namely friendship based on usefulness (amicitia utilis), friendship based on pleasure (amicitia delectabilis), and friendship rooted in unqualified goodness (amicitia honesti; amicitia quae fundatur super honestum).

== Cultural references ==
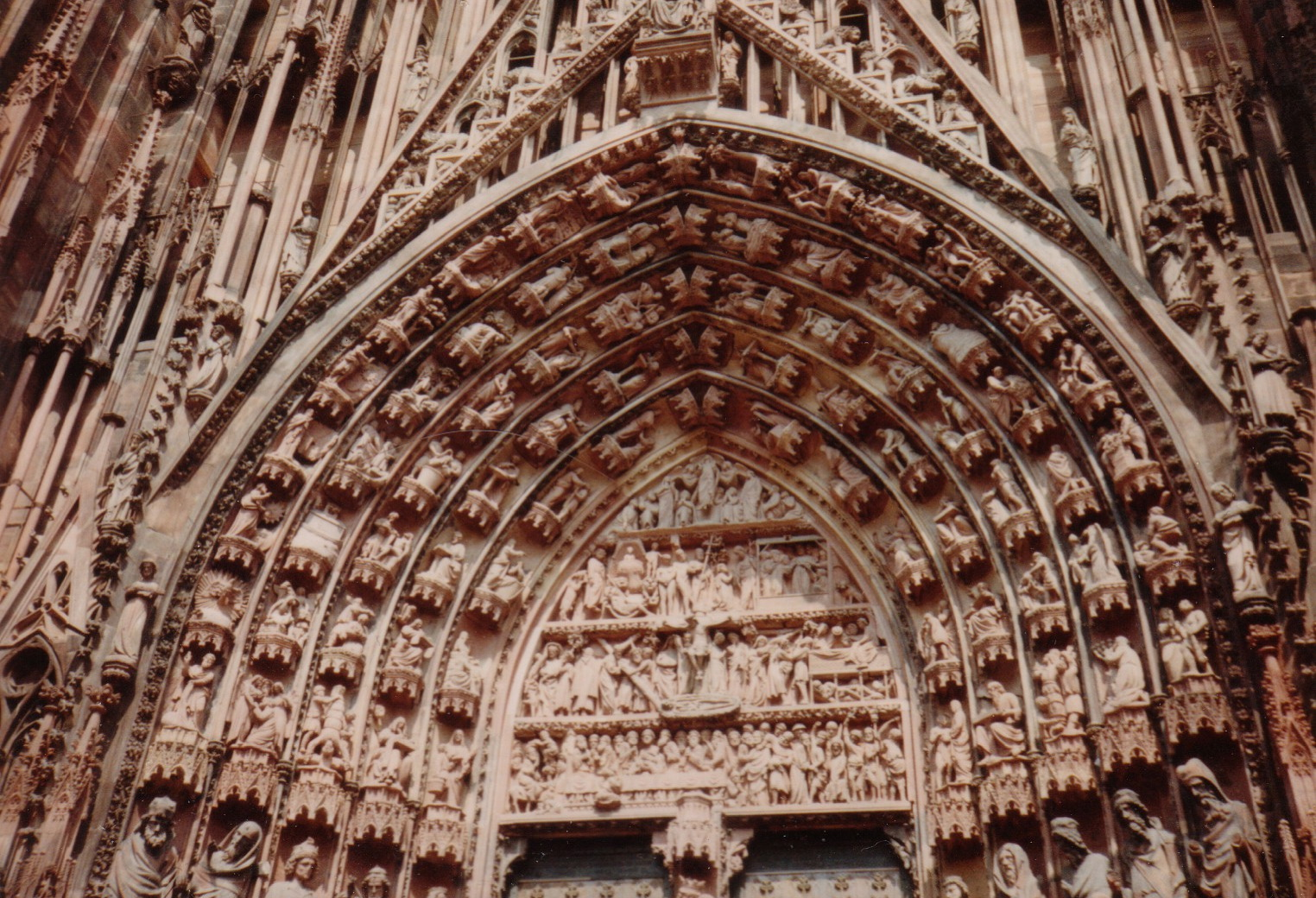
The tympanum and archivolts of Strasbourg Cathedral, with iconography inspired by Albertus Magnus

The iconography of the tympanum and archivolts of the late 13th-century portal of Strasbourg Cathedral was inspired by Albert's writings. Albert is frequently mentioned by Dante, who made his doctrine of free will the basis of his ethical system. In his Divine Comedy, Dante places Albertus with his pupil Thomas Aquinas among the great lovers of wisdom (Spiriti Sapienti) in the Heaven of the Sun.

In one version of the legend of the brazen head, Albertus Magnus is the head's creator while Thomas Aquinas is the pupil who destroys it.

In The Concept of Anxiety, Søren Kierkegaard wrote that Albert, "arrogantly boasted of his speculation before the deity and suddenly became stupid." Kierkegaard cites Gotthard Oswald Marbach whom he quotes as saying "Albertus repente ex asino factus philosophus et ex philosopho asinus" [Albert was suddenly transformed from an ass into a philosopher and from a philosopher into an ass].

In Mary Shelley's Frankenstein, the titular scientist, Victor Frankenstein, studies the works of Albertus Magnus, but rejects his theories after attending college.

Pastor Johann Eduard Erdmann considered Albert greater and more original than his pupil Aquinas.

== Influence and tribute ==
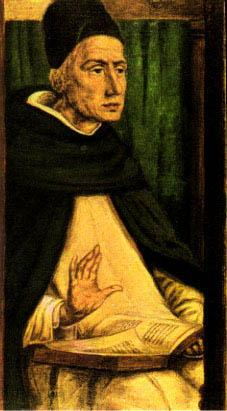
Painting by Joos (Justus) van Gent, Urbino, c. 1475

A number of mostly Catholic schools have been named after Albert, including Albertus Magnus High School in Bardonia, New York; Albertus Magnus Lyceum in River Forest, Illinois; and Albertus Magnus College in New Haven, Connecticut.

Albertus Magnus Science Hall at Thomas Aquinas College, in Santa Paula, California, is named in honor of Albert. The main science buildings at Providence College and Aquinas College in Grand Rapids, Michigan, are also named after him.

The central square at the campus of the University of Cologne features a statue of Albert and is named after him. Made by Gerhard Marcks around the 1950s, this statue is one of four replicas found in different places around the world (the others being at the University of Jena, the University of the Andes, and the University of Houston).

The St. Albert the Great Chapel and Catholic Student Center is a Roman Catholic campus ministry located in Hammond, Louisiana, serving students of Southeastern Louisiana University.

The Academy for Science and Design in New Hampshire honored Albert by naming one of its four houses Magnus House.

As a tribute to the scholar's contributions to the law, the University of Houston Law Center displays a statue of Albert. It is located on the campus of the University of Houston.

The Albertus-Magnus-Gymnasium is found in Rottweil, Germany.

In Managua, Nicaragua, the Albertus Magnus International Institute, a business and economic development research center, was founded in 2004.

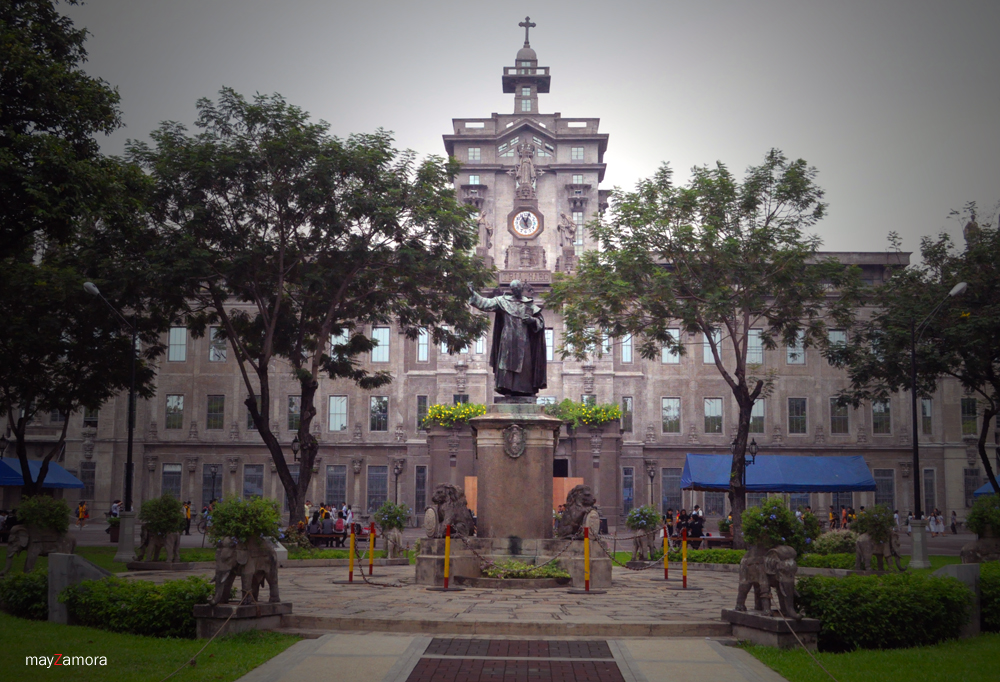
University of Santo Tomas in the Philippines

In the Philippines, the Albertus Magnus Building at the University of Santo Tomas that houses the Conservatory of Music, College of Tourism and Hospitality Management, College of Education, and UST Education High School is named in his honor. The Saint Albert the Great Science Academy in San Carlos City, Pangasinan, which offers preschool, elementary and high school education, takes pride in having St. Albert as their patron saint. Its main building was named Albertus Magnus Hall in 2008. San Alberto Magno Academy in Tubao, La Union is also dedicated in his honor. This century-old Catholic high school continues to live on its vision-mission up to this day, offering Senior High school courses.

Due to his contributions to natural philosophy, the bacterium Agrobacterium albertimagni, the plant species Alberta magna, the crustacean Bodigiella albertimagni, the fossil brachiopod Albasphe albertimagni, and the asteroid 20006 Albertus Magnus were named after him.

Numerous Catholic elementary and secondary schools are named for him, including schools in Toronto; Calgary; Cologne; and Dayton, Ohio.

The Albertus typeface is named after him. At the University of Notre Dame du Lac in Notre Dame, Indiana, the Zahm Hall Chapel is dedicated to St. Albert the Great. Fr. John Zahm, C.S.C., after whom the men's residence hall is named, looked to St. Albert's example of using religion to illumine scientific discovery. Fr. Zahm's work with the Bible and evolution is sometimes seen as a continuation of St. Albert's legacy.

The second largest student's fraternity of the Netherlands, located in the city of Groningen, is named Albertus Magnus, in honor of the saint.

The Colegio Cientifico y Artistico de San Alberto, Hopelawn, New Jersey, USA with a sister school in Nueva Ecija, Philippines was founded in 1986 in honor of him who thought and taught that religion, the sciences and the arts may be advocated as subjects which should not contradict each other but should support one another to achieve wisdom and reason.

The Vosloorus Catholic parish (located in Vosloorus Extension One, Ekurhuleni, Gauteng, South Africa) is named after the saint.

The Catholic parish in Leopoldshafen, near Karlsruhe in Germany is also named after him, too, since Albert is the patron saint of scientists and the Karlsruhe Institute of Technology has a large research center nearby.

Since the death of King Albert I, the King's Feast is celebrated in Belgium on Albert's feast day.

Edinburgh's Catholic Chaplaincy which serves the city's universities, is named after St Albert.

Sant'Alberto Magno is a titular church in Rome.

Rue Maître Albert in Paris's 5th arrondissement.

== Bibliography ==
=== Translations ===
- The Paradise of the Soul: Forty-Two Virtues to Reach Heaven, translated by Fr. Robert Nixon, OSB (Gastonia, NC: TAN Books: 2023) [translation of Paradisus Animae]
- On Fate, translated by D.P. Curtin (Philadelphia, PA: Dalcassian Publishing Company: 2023) [translation of De fato]
- On Resurrection, translated by Irven M. Resnick and Franklin T. Harkins (Washington, D.C.: Catholic University of America Press: 2020) [translation of De resurrectione]
- On the Body of the Lord, translated by Sr. Albert Marie Surmanski, OP (Washington, D.C.: Catholic University of America Press: 2017) [translation of De corpore Domini]
- On the Causes of the Properties of the Elements, translated by Irven M. Resnick (Milwaukee: Marquette University Press, 2010) [translation of Liber de causis proprietatum elementorum]
- Questions concerning Aristotle's on Animals, translated by Irven M. Resnick and Kenneth F. Kitchell Jr. (Washington, D.C.: Catholic University of America Press, 2008) [translation of Quaestiones super De animalibus]
- The Cardinal Virtues: Aquinas, Albert, and Philip the Chancellor, translated by R. E. Houser (Toronto: Pontifical Institute of Mediæval Studies, 2004) [contains the translations of Parisian Summa, part six: On the good and Commentary on the Sentences of Peter Lombard, book 3, dist. 33 & 36]
- The Commentary of Albertus Magnus on Book 1 of Euclid's Elements of Geometry, edited by Anthony Lo Bello (Boston: Brill Academic Publishers, 2003) [translation of Priumus Euclidis cum commento Alberti]
- On Animals: A Medieval Summa Zoologica, translated by Kenneth F. Kitchell Jr. and Irven Michael Resnick (Baltimore; London: Johns Hopkins University Press, 1999) [translation of De animalibus]
- Book of Minerals, translated by Dorothy Wyckoff (Oxford University Press, 1967) [translation of De mineralibus]
- Paola Zambelli, The Speculum Astronomiae and Its Enigma: Astrology, Theology, and Science in Albertus Magnus and His Contemporaries (Dordrecht; Boston: Kluwer Academic Publishers, 1992) [includes Latin text and English translation of Speculum astronomiae]
- Albert & Thomas: Selected Writings, translated by Simon Tugwell, Classics of Western Spirituality (New York: Paulist Press, 1988) [contains translation of Super Dionysii Mysticam theologiam]
- On Union with God, translated by a Benedictine of Princethorpe Priory (London: Burns Oates & Washbourne, 1911) [reprinted as (Felinfach: Llanerch Enterprises, 1991) and (London: Continuum, 2000)] [translation of De adherendo Deo]

== See also ==
- Christian mysticism
- List of Catholic saints
- List of Catholic clergy scientists
- Saint Albert the Great, patron saint archive
- Science in the Middle Ages
