= Gerard of Silteo =

Dominican astronomer and critic of astrology

Gerard of Silteo also given as Gerardus Feltrensis, Gerardo of Feltre, Gerardus de Silteo, Gerardus de Silcro (11 March 1218 – c. 1291?) was a 13th century Dominican friar who is known only from a manuscript treatise, Summa de astris (1264/65) which is thought to have been prompted by the appearance of the Great Comet of 1264. The book examines stellar objects, astronomical knowledge of the time, and includes a criticism of astrology of the period.

== Biography ==
Gerard is thought to have been born in Feltre (Belluno) and according to a horoscope record in his work his date of birth has been determined as 11 March 1218. His name has been variously recorded and some may be corruptions such as "Sileto". He is thought to have joined the Dominican order during the time of Giovanni da Vercelli as head of the Order (1264–83). He considered Albertus Magnus as a master of the subject but went on to criticize his astrology. He studied the Great Comet of 1264 and this included correspondence with Albertus Magnus, Thomas Aquinas, and Robert Kilwardby. This possibly resulted in the publication of Summa de astris which has been dated to the year 1264 or 1265. It was divided into three parts including a dedication and prologue. Three copies of the manuscript are known. Gerard examined the works of Ptolemy, and Arab works including those of Abu Mashar, Sahl ibn Bishr (Zahel), Omar Khayyam, Al-Farghani, and Mashallah. Gerard criticized astrology as a form of blasphemy for it claimed that all human actions, good or bad, were the result of the positions of heavenly bodies.
