= Jean-Baptiste Soleil =

French optician and engineer (1798–1878)

Jean-Baptiste François Soleil (1798–1878) was a French optician and engineer. He invented the Babinet–Soleil compensator.

== Biography ==
In 1819, Soleil founded a company operating under his name at 23 Passage Vivienne in Paris, specialised in making optics instruments for such notable researchers as Augustin-Jean Fresnel, François Arago, Léon Foucault and Jacques Babinet. In 1825, he moved business to 21, rue de l'Odéon. In 1843, he made a heliostat for Jean Thiébault Silbermann. In 1849, the business was split between to divisions under his son Henri Soleil, and his son-in-law Jules Duboscq. The Soleil division went on under Laurent Soleil, and has now been renamed to Jobin Yvon. The Duboscq division was renamed to Duboscq Pellin in 1883, and then simply Pellin in 1886. In 1852, the Soleil workshop was purchased by Louis Sautter, maker of Fresnel lenses for lighthouses, who founded Sautter et Cie, later Sautter-Lemonnier et Cie, and eventually Sautter-Harlé.
