= Saccharimeter =

A saccharimeter, from Ancient Greek σάκχαρ (sákkhar), meaning "sugar", and μέτρον (métron), meaning "measure", is an instrument for measuring the concentration of sugar solutions.

This is commonly achieved using a measurement of refractive index (refractometer) or the angle of rotation of polarization of optically active sugars (polarimeter).

Saccharimeters are used in food processing industries, brewing, and the distilled alcoholic drinks industry.

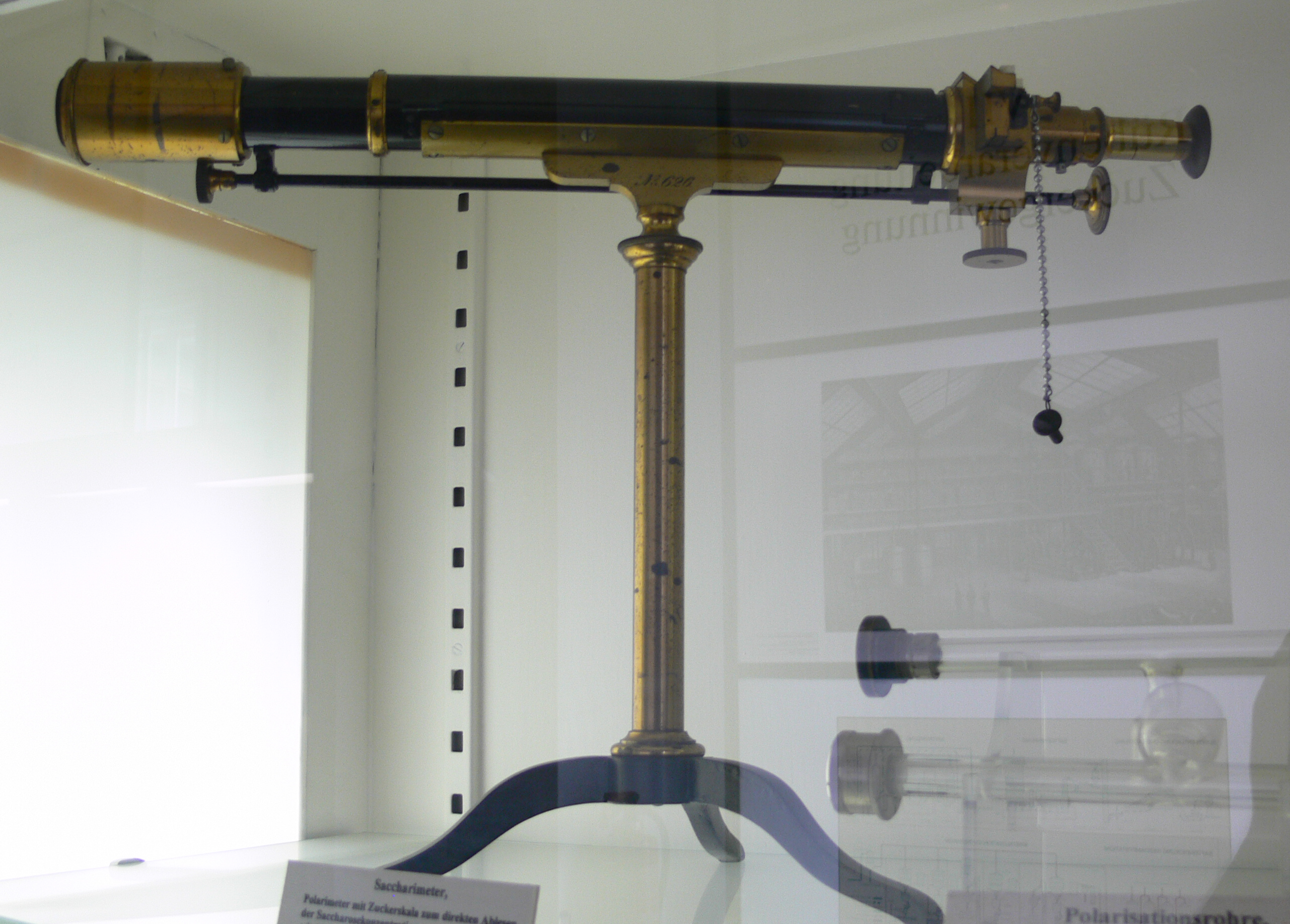
A saccharimeter at the Sugar Museum (Berlin)

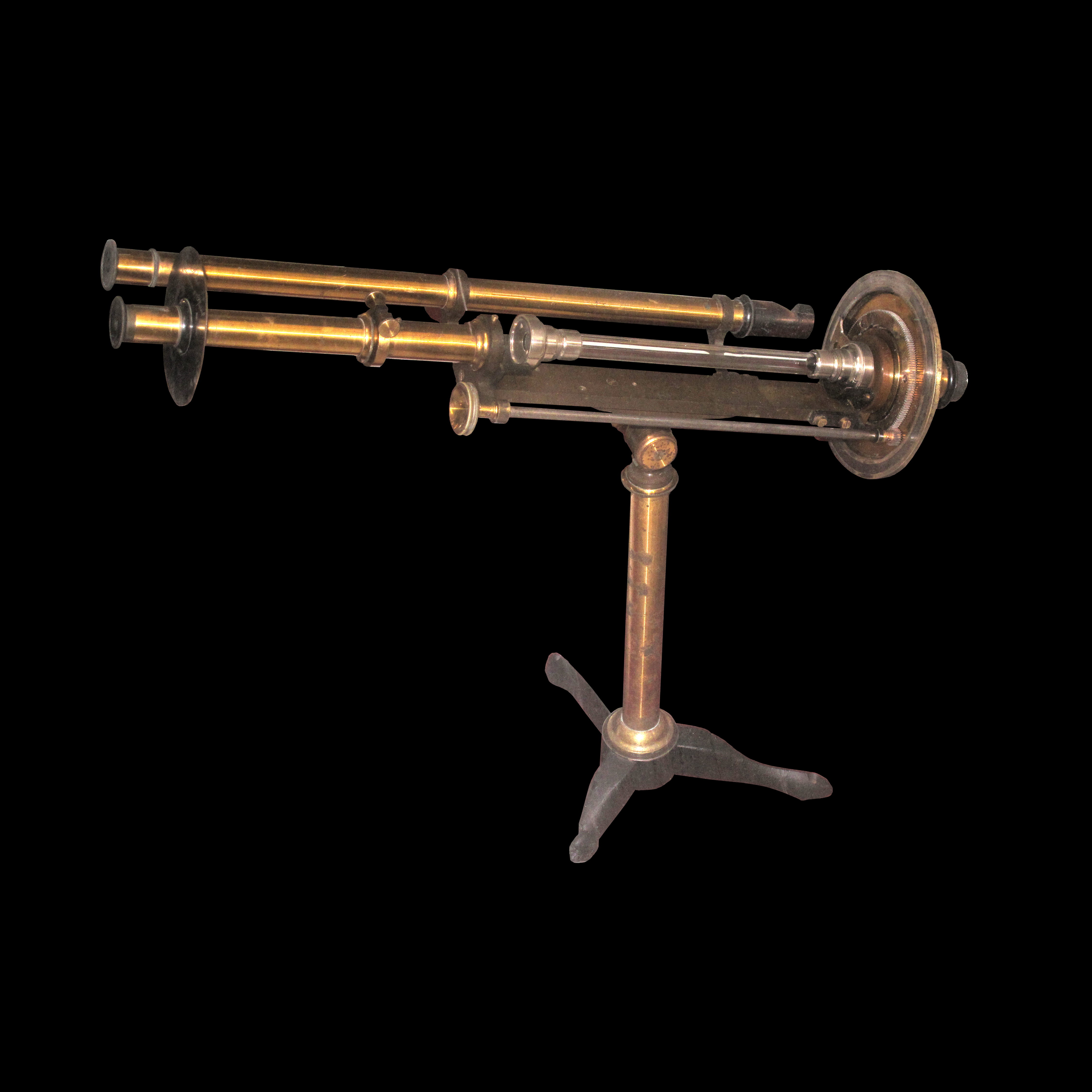
Saccharimeter at the EPFL Physics Museum

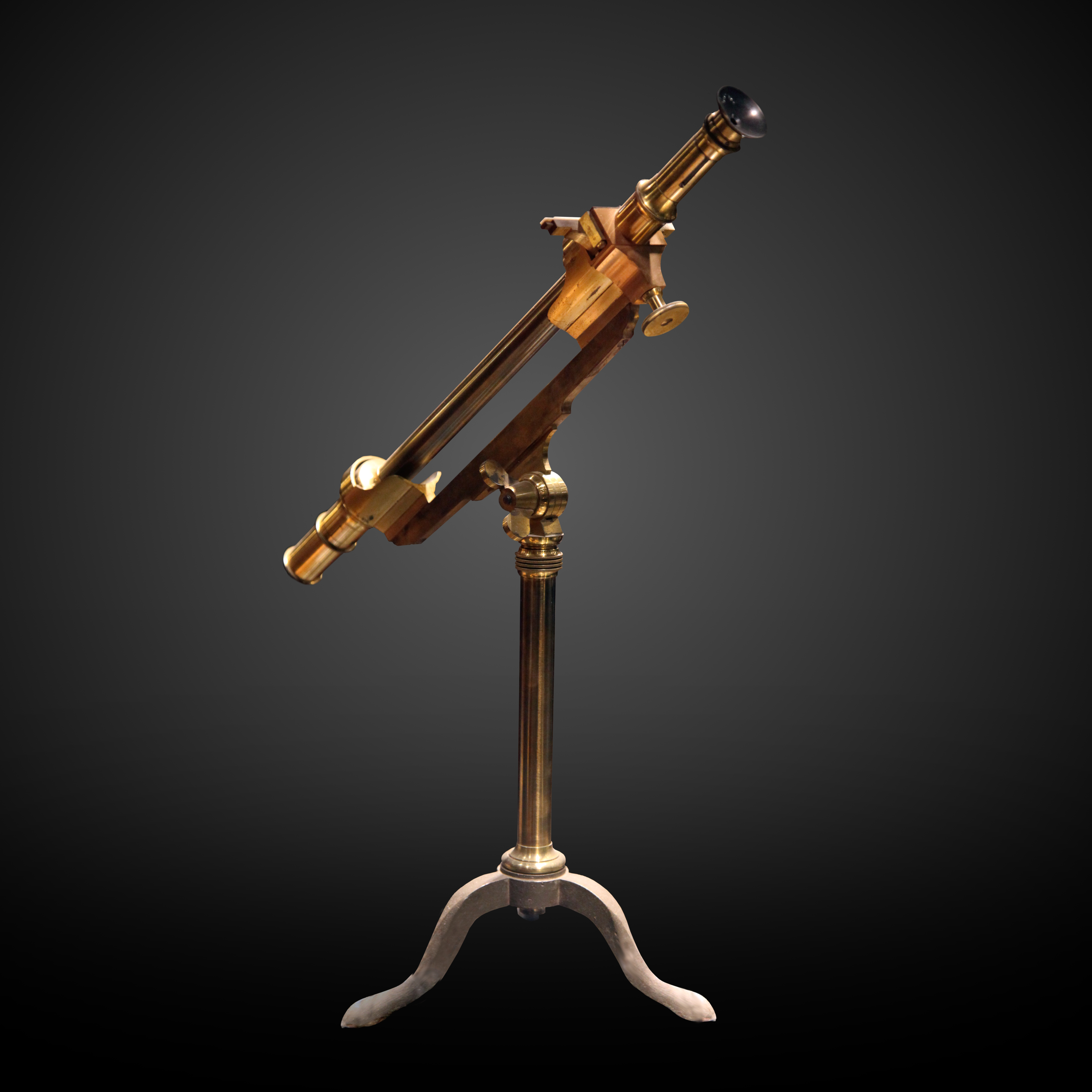
Soleil saccharimeter on display at the Palais de la Découverte
