= Great Comet of 1556 =

Comet

C/1556 D1 (Great Comet of 1556)
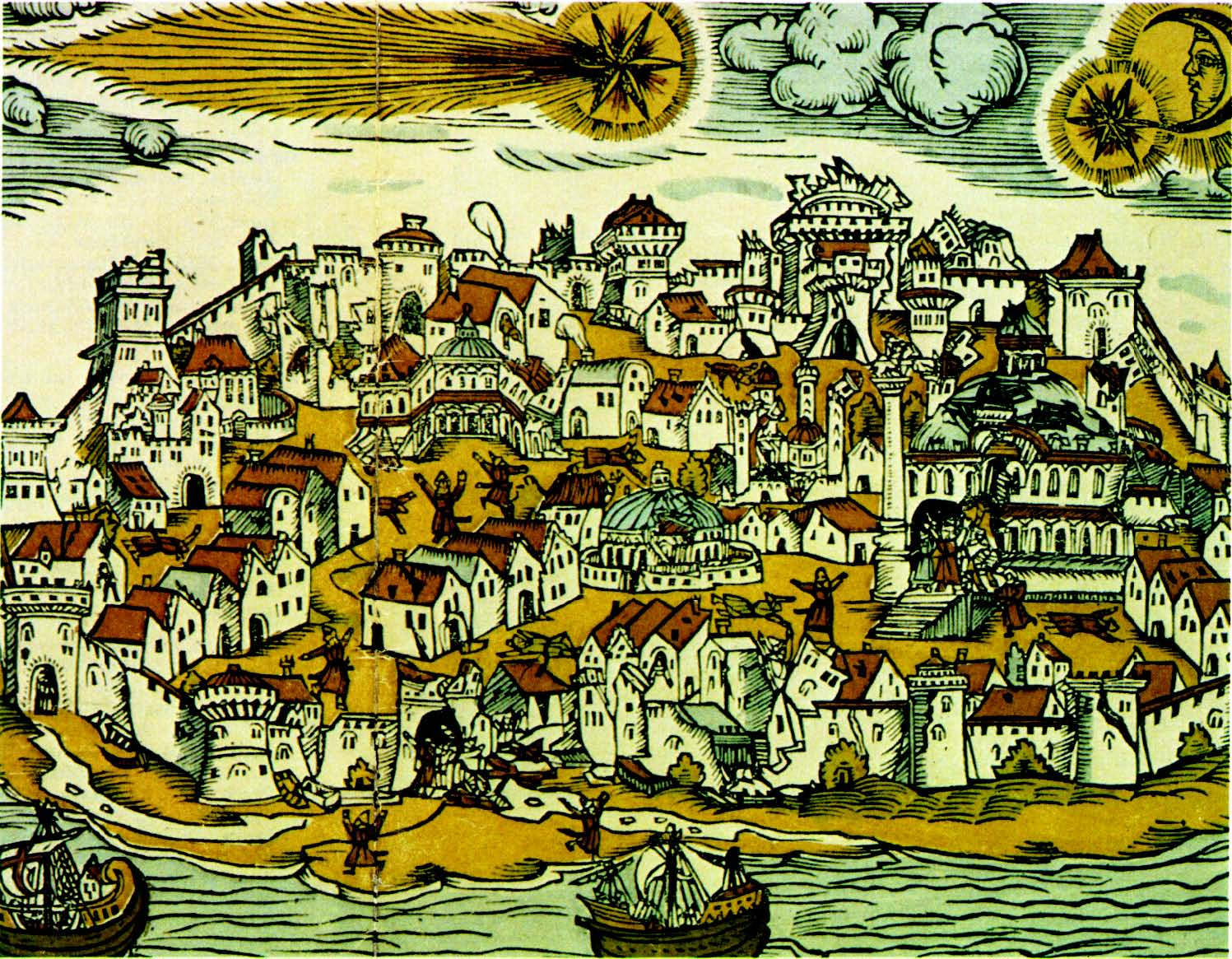
- Woodcut of the Great Comet of 1556 over Istanbul

Discovery
- Discovery date: 27 February 1556

Orbital characteristics
- Epoch: 22 April 1556 (JD 2289499.185)
- Observation arc: 52 days
- Number of observations: 36
- Perihelion: 0.4908 AU
- Eccentricity: ~1.000
- Inclination: 32.37°
- Longitude of ascending node: 181.44°
- Argument of periapsis: 100.87°
- Last perihelion: 22 April 1556

The Great Comet of 1556 (designated C/1556 D1 in modern nomenclature) was a comet that first appeared in February 1556 and was observed throughout much of Europe. The comet appears to have been seen in some places before the end of February, but it was not generally observed until the middle of the first week of March. Its apparent diameter was equal to half that of the Moon, and the tail was said to resemble "the flame of a torch agitated by the wind." Cornelius Gemma, the son of Gemma Frisius, said that the head of the comet, when it first appeared, was as large as Jupiter and that its color resembled that of Mars.

The course of the comet of 1556 was observed by Paul Fabricius, a mathematician and physician at the court of Charles V, Holy Roman Emperor.

According to NASA, the comet was first reported on 27 February 1556. It was in perigee on 13 March and in perihelion on 22 April.

== Charles V comet ==
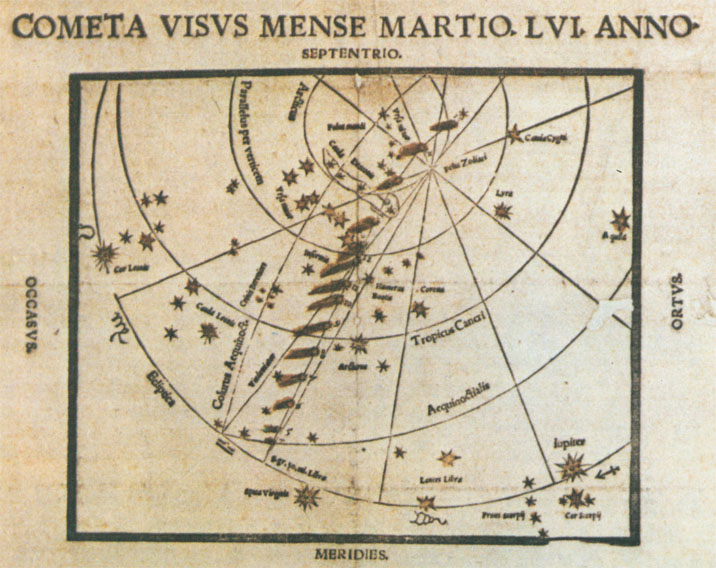
An astronomical broadsheet by Paul Fabricius, showing the map of the 1556 comet's course

The Great Comet of 1556 is called the comet of Charles V, Holy Roman Emperor. When he first caught sight of it, he stood aghast and exclaimed: "By this dread sign my fates do summon me". Charles had long meditated about retiring from the world after his conquests. Regarding the comet as a sign of Heaven's command to do so, he hastened towards the peaceful monastery of St. Juste, Placentia.

An anonymous English treatise on Blazing Stares (1618) spoke of the comet as follows:

In the time of Charles the Emperor, surnamed the Great, a blazing star appeared, in the contemplation whereof the Emperor, having his eyes earnestly bent upon the star and considering profoundly thereupon, at length was wrapped into a great astonishment touching the significance of the same; and sending for a philosopher named Eginard, reasoned with him to and fro about the star, saying in conclusion that the appearing thereof did threaten unto him some dire calamity.

== Contemporary religious interpretation ==
The Portuguese Dominican friar Gaspar da Cruz, who visited Guangzhou in 1556, associated the comet with the devastating 1556 Shaanxi earthquake. In his 1569 book, he wondered if the comet was a sign of calamities not just for China, but for the entire world and could be even the sign of the birth of Antichrist.

== Alleged connection to the Great Comet of 1264 ==
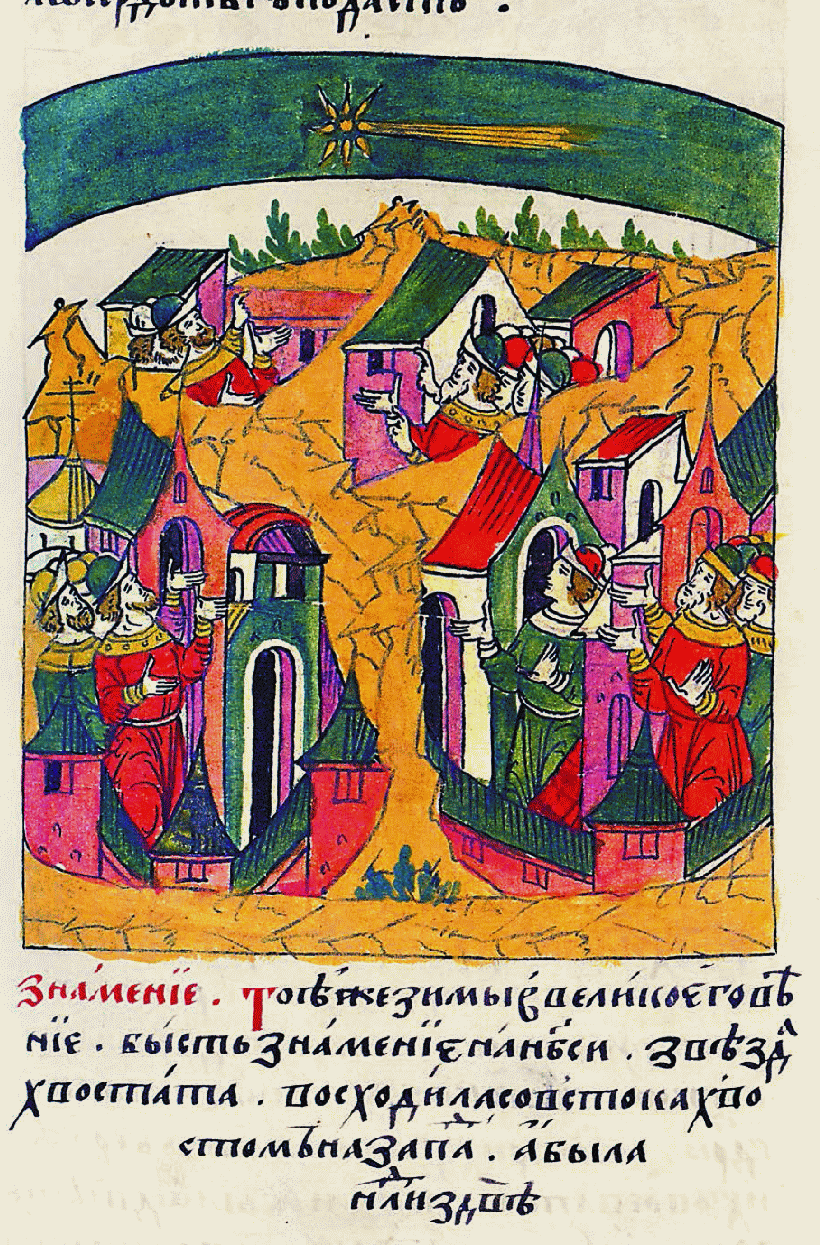
A comet seen in Russia during two weeks in winter, 1556. Illustrated Chronicle of Ivan the Terrible

Grounding his calculations upon elements deduced from Conrad Wolfhardt's chart along with some other crude data gathered from old records, and comparing the result he obtained with the account given by Friar Giles of Cambridge of a grand comet which appeared in 1264, John Russell Hind was led to conclude, as Richard Dunthorne had been in the previous century, that the comet of Charles V was that of 1264 returned. At any rate, he found a high degree of probability in favor of the conclusion at which he had arrived, and he argued that the bodies of both years were identical. Hence, he concluded that a return to perihelion might be looked for about the middle of the 19th century, 1848 to 1850. The prediction failed, and as of 2009, no observed comet has matched the orbital elements of either comet. David A. Sargent wrote that available evidence points to there being no connection between the comets of 1264 and 1556.

== Notes ==
- This article incorporates text from On the expected return of the great comet of 1264 and 1556, by John Russell Hind, a publication from 1848, now in the public domain in the United States.
- This article incorporates text from The Anglo-Saxon review, Volume 6, by Lady Randolph Spencer Churchill, a publication from 1900, now in the public domain in the United States.
