= Babinet's principle =

Equivalence between complementary antenna types

In physics, Babinet's principle states that the diffraction pattern from an opaque body is identical to that from an aperture (a hole in a screen) of the same size and shape except for the overall forward beam intensity. It was formulated in the 1800s by French physicist Jacques Babinet.

A quantum version of Babinet's principle has been derived in the context of quantum networks.

== Explanation ==
Assume B is the original diffracting body, and B' is its complement, i.e., a body that is transparent. The sum of the radiation patterns caused by B and B' must be the same as the radiation pattern of the unobstructed beam. In places where the undisturbed beam would not have reached, this means that the radiation patterns caused by B and B' must be opposite in phase, but equal in amplitude.

Diffraction patterns from apertures or bodies of known size and shape are compared with the pattern from the object to be measured. For instance, the size of red blood cells can be found by comparing their diffraction pattern with an array of small holes. One consequence of Babinet's principle is the extinction paradox, which states that in the diffraction limit, the radiation removed from the beam due to a particle is equal to twice the particle's cross section times the flux. This is because the amount of radiation absorbed or reflected is equal to the flux through the particle's cross-section, but by Babinet's principle the light diffracted forward is the same as the light that would pass through a hole in the shape of a particle; so amount of the light diffracted forward also equals the flux through the particle's cross section.

The principle is most often used in optics but it is also true for other forms of electromagnetic radiation and is, in fact, a general theorem of diffraction in wave mechanics. Babinet's principle finds most use in its ability to detect equivalence in size and shape.

== Demonstration experiment ==
The effect can be simply observed by using a laser. First place a thin (approx. 0.1 mm) wire into the laser beam and observe the diffraction pattern. Then observe the diffraction pattern when the laser is shone through a narrow slit. The slit can be made either by using a laser printer or photocopier to print onto clear plastic film or by using a pin to draw a line on a piece of glass that has been smoked over a candle flame.

== Babinet's principle in radiofrequency structures ==
Babinet's principle can be used in antenna engineering to find complementary impedances. A consequence of the principle states that

$$Z_\text{metal} \, Z_\text{slot} = \frac{\eta^2}{4},$$

where Z_{metal} and Z_{slot} are input impedances of the metal and slot radiating pieces, and $\eta = \sqrt{\mu/\epsilon}$ is the intrinsic impedance of the medium in which the structure is immersed. Note that (i) $\eta$ can be an effective or equivalent (but always homogeneous) medium, in case the structure lies on the interface of two different dielectrics, and (ii) the above formula strictly applies to structures with rotational symmetry, e.g., square or circular shapes; in the more general case, Z_{metal} and Z_{slot} refer to complementary and $\pi/2$-rotated variants.

In addition, Z_{slot} is not only the impedance of the slot, but can be viewed as the complementary structure impedance (a dipole or loop in many cases). Z_{metal} is often referred to as Z_{screen}, where the screen comes from the optical definition. The thin sheet or screen does not have to be metal, but rather any material that supports a $\vec{J}$ (current density vector) leading to a magnetic potential $\vec{A}$. One issue with this equation is that the screen must be relatively thin to the given wavelength (or range thereof). If it is not, modes can begin to form, or fringing fields may no longer be negligible.

Note that Babinet's principle does not account for polarization. In 1946, H. G. Booker published Slot Aerials and Their Relation to Complementary Wire Aerials to extend Babinet's principle to account for polarization (otherwise known as Booker's extension). This information is drawn from, as stated above, Balanis's third edition Antenna Theory textbook.

== Babinet's principle in elastodynamics ==
In elastodynamics (linear elasticity), Babinet's principle applies to the same field (stress or particle velocity), but for complementary screens that have different boundary conditions. If the original screen fulfills stress-free or Neumann boundary condition, the complementary screen must fulfill rigid or Dirichlet boundary condition. Conversely, if the original screen is rigid, the complementary screen must fulfill stress-free conditions. The principle was established by Carcione and Gangi for elastic waves. These authors used a direct grid method based on a domain decomposition (two meshes) and the spatial Fourier/Chebyshev differential operator to simulate the numerical experiments. The principle is valid for the body waves SH and qP-qSV in anisotropic media, even in the case of cuspidal triangles (triplications) of the qSV wave. As expected, lateral (refracted) and interface waves, such as the Rayleigh wave, do not fulfill the principle.

== See also ==
- Bistatic radar
- List of eponymous laws
