= Great Comet of 1264 =

Parabolic comet

C/1264 N1 (Great Comet of 1264)
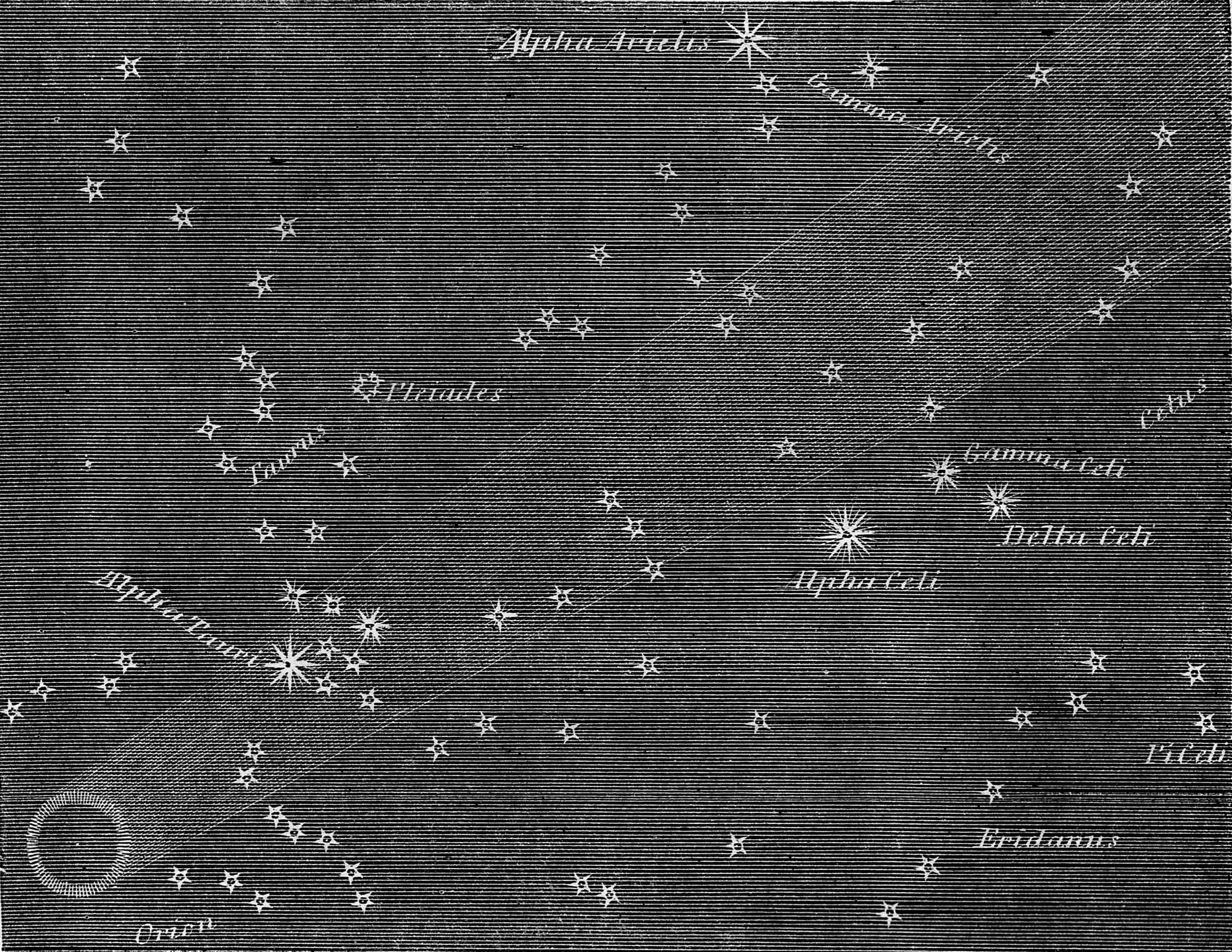
- An illustration of the great comet's position in the sky from 1858

Discovery
- Discovery date: 17 July 1264

Orbital characteristics
- Epoch: 20 July 1264 (JD 2182934.79)
- Observation arc: 70 days
- Number of observations: 7
- Perihelion: 0.8249 AU
- Eccentricity: ~1.000
- Inclination: 16.40°
- Longitude of ascending node: 151.04°
- Argument of periapsis: 159.71°
- Last perihelion: 20 July 1264

Physical characteristics
- Apparent magnitude: 0.0 (1264 apparition)

The Great Comet of 1264 (designated as C/1264 N1 in modern nomenclature) was one of the brightest comets on record. It appeared in July 1264 and remained visible to the end of September.

== Observations ==
It was first seen during the evenings after sunset but appeared in its greatest splendor in the weeks afterward, when it became visible during the mornings in the northeastern sky, with the tail perceived long before the comet itself rose above the horizon. The head of the comet seemed like an obscure and ill-defined star, and the tail passed from that portion of it like expanded flames, stretching forth towards the mid-heavens to a distance of one hundred degrees from the nucleus. The comet of 1264 was described to have been an object of great size and brilliance. The comet's splendor was greatest at the end of August and the beginning of September. At the time, when the head was just visible above the eastern horizon in the morning sky, the tail stretched out past the mid-heaven towards the west or was nearly 100° in length.

The chroniclers of the time mention the various remarkable events that occurred in Europe during this period and in particular connect the appearance of the comet with the death of Pope Urban IV, who fell sick allegedly on the very day when the comet was first seen and died at the exact time it disappeared on October 3, 1264. It was said that the "prodigy of a hairy star" had brought upon his illness, and slipped away when the job was finished. Also the comet was mentioned in Galician–Volhynian Chronicle and described as 'causate star on the East, it was terrible in appearance, emitting large rays from itself - that is why this star is called hairy'.

The comet was likewise observed in China, and the descriptions agree with the statements of the European historians.

According to NASA, the comet was first reported on 17 July 1264. It was in perihelion on 20 July and in perigee on 29 July.

== Alleged connection to the Great Comet of 1556 ==
Some astronomers speculated that the Great Comet of 1556 and the Great comet of 1264 are the same comet. Alexandre Guy Pingré, who in his Cométographie (1783) calls the Great Comet of 1264 a "great and celebrated comet", calculated the comet's parabolic orbit, which he found bore great resemblance to that of the comet of 1556. The comet of 1264, says Pingré, "is very probably the same as that of 1556; its periodical revolution is about 292 years; and its return may consequently be expected about 1848."

John Russell Hind in On the expected return of the great comet of 1264 and 1556 says:

My calculations relating to the Comet have been pretty extensive, and I have not omitted to examine closely all the circumstances recorded respecting it. The conclusion at which I have arrived is this,— that there is a very high probability in favour of the supposed identity of the Comets of 1264 and 1556

However, in 1877, Amédée Guillemin wrote, in part quoting Babinet,

Its return was first expected in 1848. 'But 1849, 1850, 1851, and 1852 have passed, and the great comet has failed to appear!' ... Splendid comets appeared in 1858, 1861, and 1862, but the comet of Charles V. never returned... [T]he comet of 1264 and 1556 must be considered lost; and if in reality merely accidental causes prevented its being observed, and it should appear again, it will be our descendants in the twenty-second century who will have the satisfaction of celebrating its return.

Comets sometimes may disappear because of orbital derangement from an ellipse to a parabola or a hyperbola. Sir Isaac Newton showed that a body controlled by the Sun moves in a conic section; that is, an ellipse, a parabola or a hyperbola. Because the last two are open curves, a comet that pursues such a path would go off into space never to reappear. A derangement of orbit from closed to open curve has doubtless happened often.
