= St. Andrew's Church, Cologne =

Coordinates: 50°56′30″N 6°57′14″E

St. Andrew's Church
- German: Basilika St. Andreas
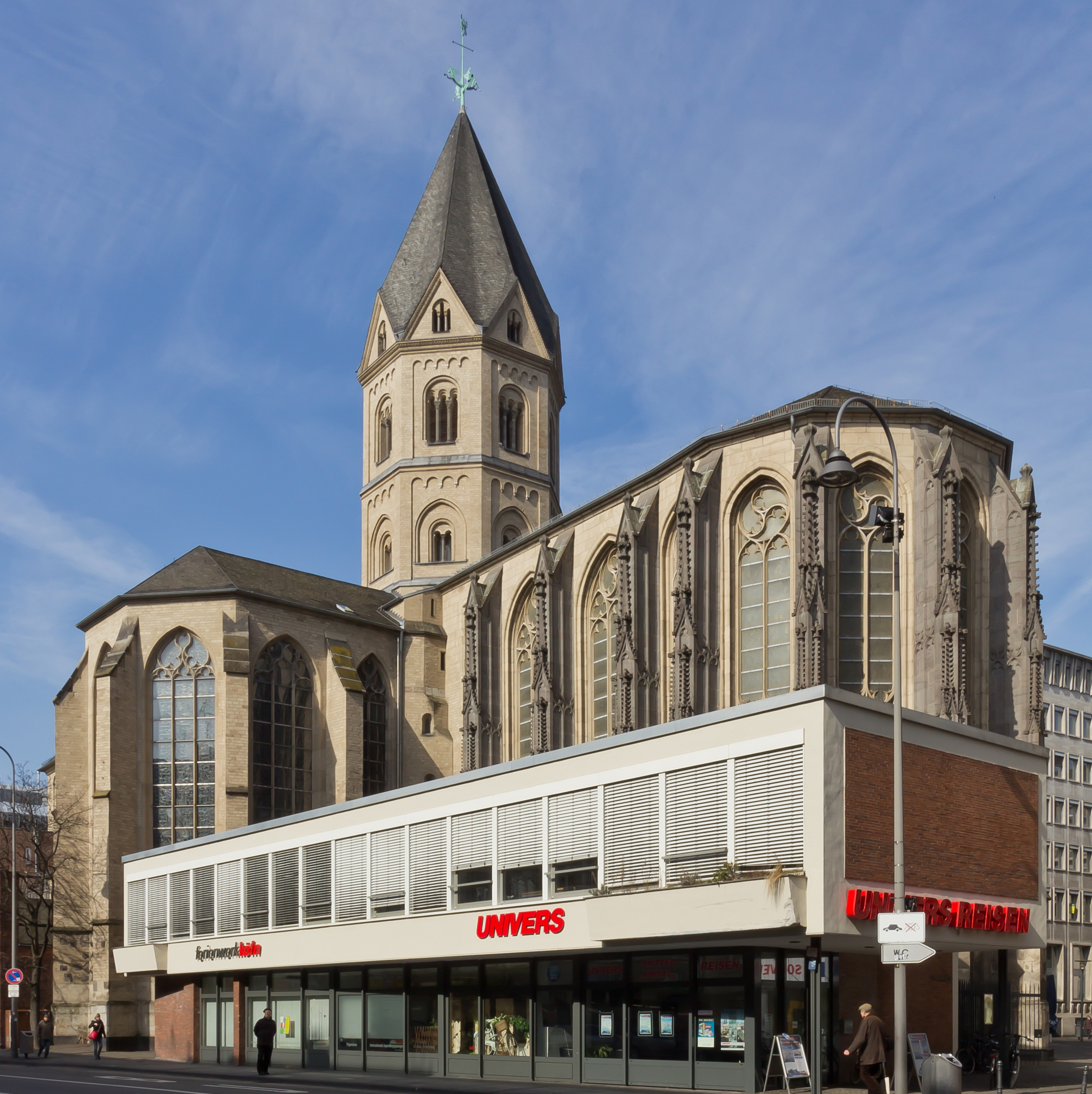
- St. Andrew's Church
- Location: Cologne
- Country: Germany
- Denomination: Roman Catholic
- Website: Website

Architecture
- Functional status: Active
- Style: Romanesque
- Years built: 10th century

Administration
- Province: Dominican Province of Teutonia
- Archdiocese: Cologne
- Parish: Parish of the Apostles; German: Pfarrei St. Aposteln

Clergy
- Pastor: Fr. Christoph J. Wekenborg OP

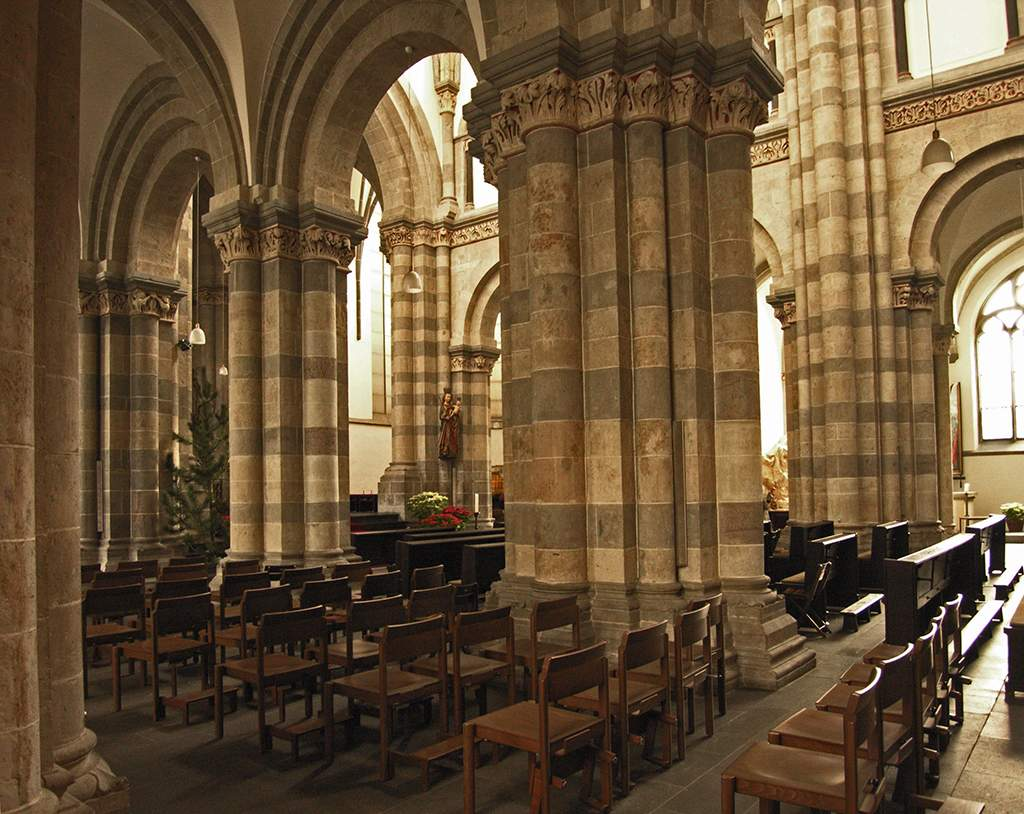
Interior view

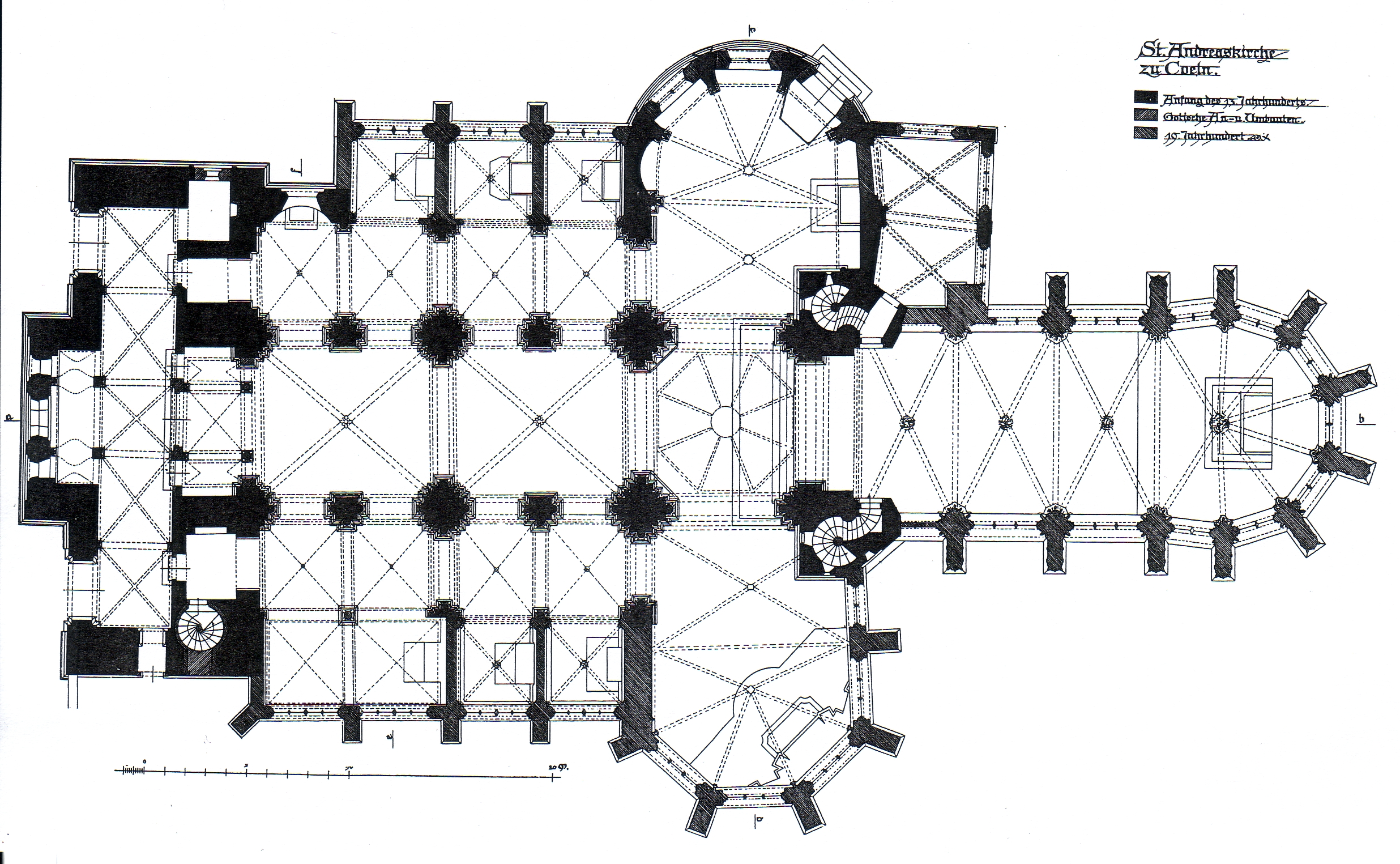
Floor plan

St. Andrew's (German: St. Andreas) is a 10th-century Romanesque church located in the old town of Cologne, Germany. It is one of twelve churches built in Cologne in that period. Archbishop Gero consecrated the church in 974, dedicating it to St. Andrew, although an earlier church at the site was dedicated to St. Matthew. In the 12th century, the church was rebuilt in the Romanesque style, and was probably completed after the great fire of Cologne in 1220. In the crypt of the church lies a Roman sarcophagus from the 3rd century, which holds the remains of the 13th-century theologian and natural philosopher St. Albertus Magnus. Since 1947, the Dominican Order has ministered to the church.

== See also ==
- Cologne Cathedral
- German architecture
- List of regional characteristics of Romanesque churches
- Romanesque architecture
- Romanesque secular and domestic architecture
- Twelve Romanesque churches of Cologne
