= Extinction paradox =

In the small wavelength limit, the total scattering cross-section of an impenetrable sphere is twice its geometrical cross-sectional area (which is the value obtained in classical mechanics).

Several explanations for this phenomenon have been proposed:

- destructive interference inside particle shadow
- diffraction and shadowing of light by particle
- superposition of incident and scattered field
- cancellation of incident wave inside particle
