= Babinet–Soleil compensator =

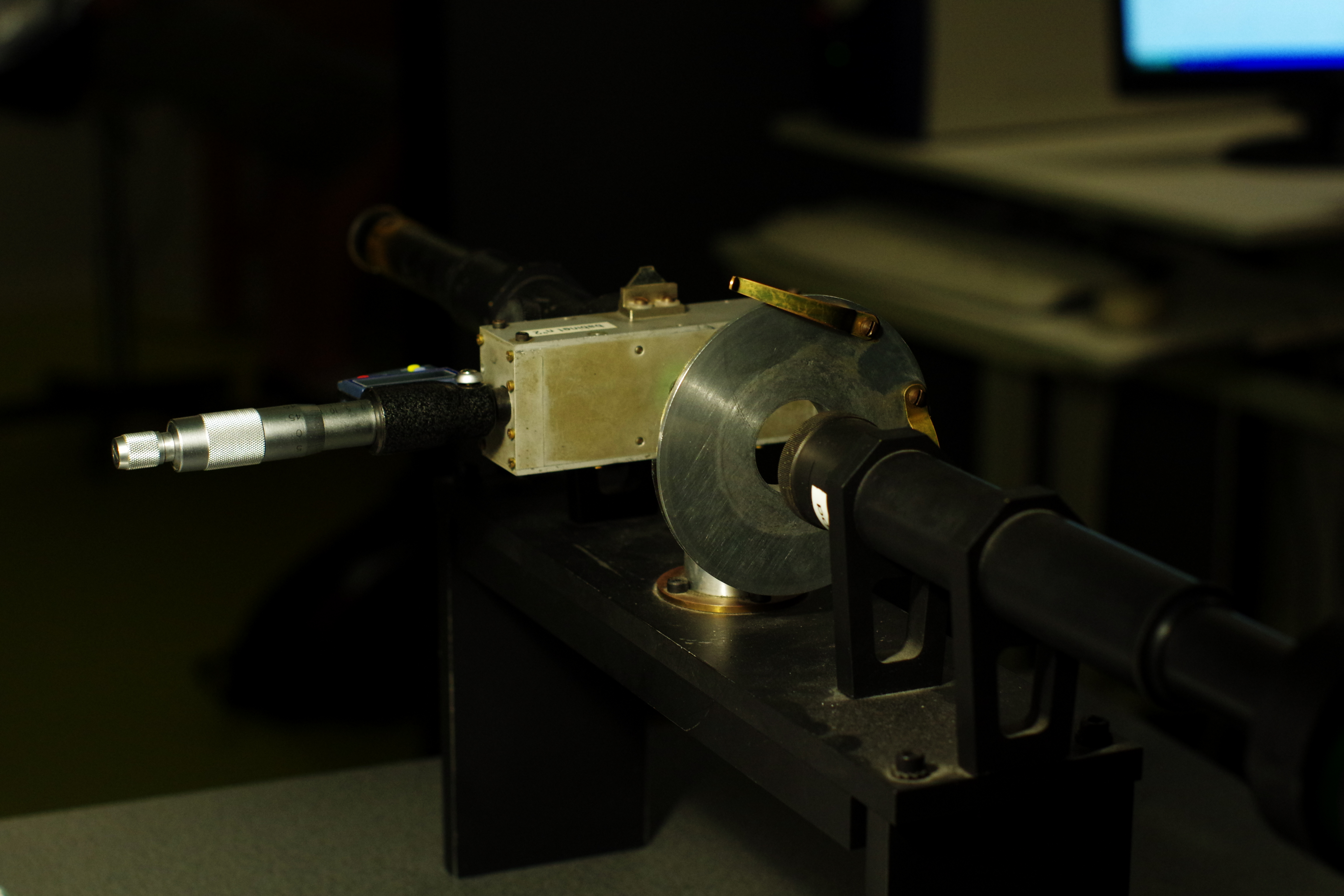
Babinet compensator

The Babinet–Soleil compensator is a continuously variable, zero-order retarder consists of two birefringent wedges, one of which is movable, and another is fixed to a compensator plate. The orientation of the long axis of the wedges is perpendicular to the long axis of the compensator plate. It is named after Jacques Babinet and Jean-Baptiste Soleil.

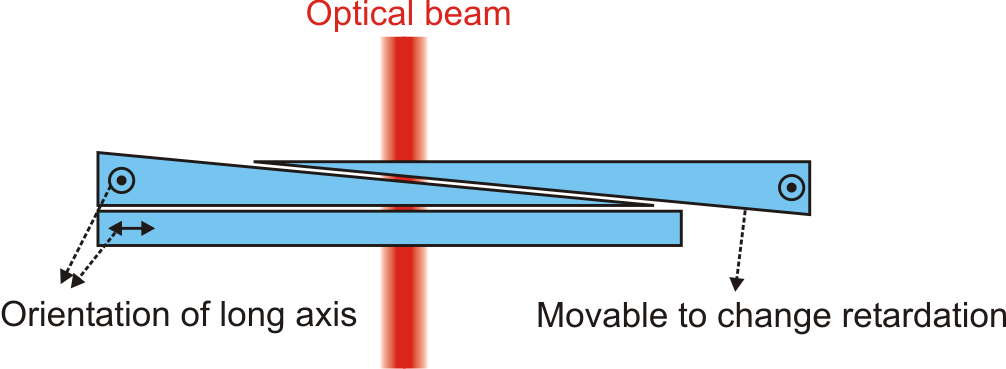
Schematic view of a Babinet–Soleil compensator
