= Vincenzo Onofri =

Italian sculptor

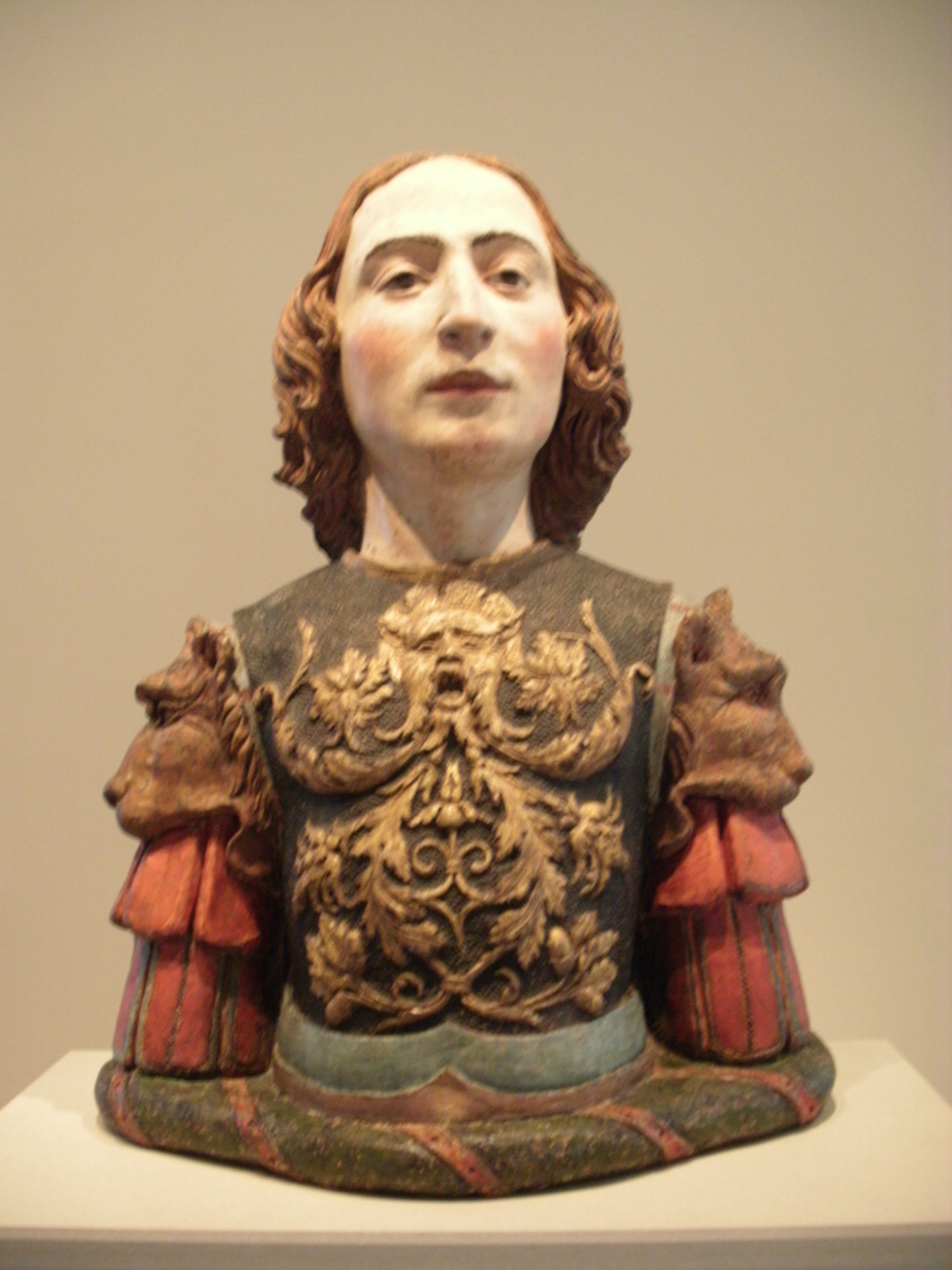
Man in Armor, terra cotta, polychromed and gilded, of c. 1500, in the National Gallery of Art

Vincenzo Onofri (active between 1493 and 1524) was a Bolognese sculptor. Little is known about his life and career; he is known, however, to have worked mainly in terracotta, which he painted and gilded for display. The San Petronio Basilica has a tomb believed to have some of his work. Numerous of his large sculptural groups still exist; smaller works can also be found in a number of museum collections worldwide.
