= Jacques Babinet =

French physicist, mathematician and astronomer (1794–1872)

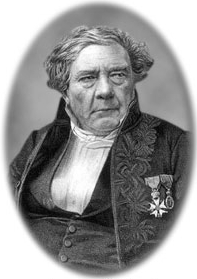
- Born: 5 March 1794; Lusignan, France
- Died: 21 October 1872 (aged 78); Paris, France
- Known for: Invention of polariscope; Babinet's principle; Babinet projection; Babinet–Soleil compensator; Baer–Babinet law
- Scientific career
- Fields: Optics
- Institutions: University of Paris; Collège de France

Jacques Babinet (French: [babinɛ]; 5 March 1794 – 21 October 1872) was a French physicist, mathematician, and astronomer who is best known for his contributions to optics.

Among Babinet's accomplishments are the 1827 standardization of the angstrom unit for measuring light using the red cadmium line's wavelength, and Babinet's principle that similar diffraction patterns are produced by two complementary screens. He was the first to suggest using wavelengths of light to standardize measurements. His idea was first used between 1960 and 1983, when a meter was defined as a wavelength of light from krypton gas.

== Biography ==
His father was Jean Babinet, and his mother was Marie‐Anne Félicité Bonneau du Chesn. Babinet started his studies at the Lycée Napoléon but was persuaded to abandon a legal education for the pursuit of science. A graduate of the École polytechnique, which he left in 1812 for the Military School at Metz, he was later a professor at the Sorbonne and at the Collège de France. In 1840, he was elected as a member of the Académie Royale des Sciences. He was also an astronomer of the Bureau des Longitudes.

Babinet was interested in the optical properties of minerals throughout his career. He designed and created many scientific instruments utilized to determine crystalline structure and polarization properties, including the polariscope and an optical goniometer to measure refractive indices. The Babinet compensator, an accessory useful in polarized light microscopy, was built with twin, opposed quartz wedges having mutually perpendicular crystallographic axes, and is still widely employed in microscopy. This design avoids the problems inherent in the basic quartz wedge: the zero reading coincides with the thin end of the wedge, which is often lost when grinding the plate during manufacture.

Expanding his fascination of diffraction to meteorology, Babinet spent a significant amount of time in the study of rainbows. His astronomical research focused on Mercury's mass and the Earth's magnetism, while his inventions included valve improvements for air pumps and a hygrometer. In geography and hydrogeomorphology, the Baer–Babinet law helps to explain and predict directionality in the course of rivers. Babinet's cartography work includes homalographic projections where the parallels are rectilinear and meridian lines are elliptical.

Babinet lectured on meteorology and optics, promoted science to public audiences, and wrote popular scientific articles.

== Family life ==
On October 30, 1820, Jacques Babinet was married to Adelaïde Laugier (July 14, 1795 – July 27, 1849). They had two children: Charles Babinet (December 8, 1821 – May 31, 1907) and Léon Babinet (July 26, 1825 – 1913).

== Works ==
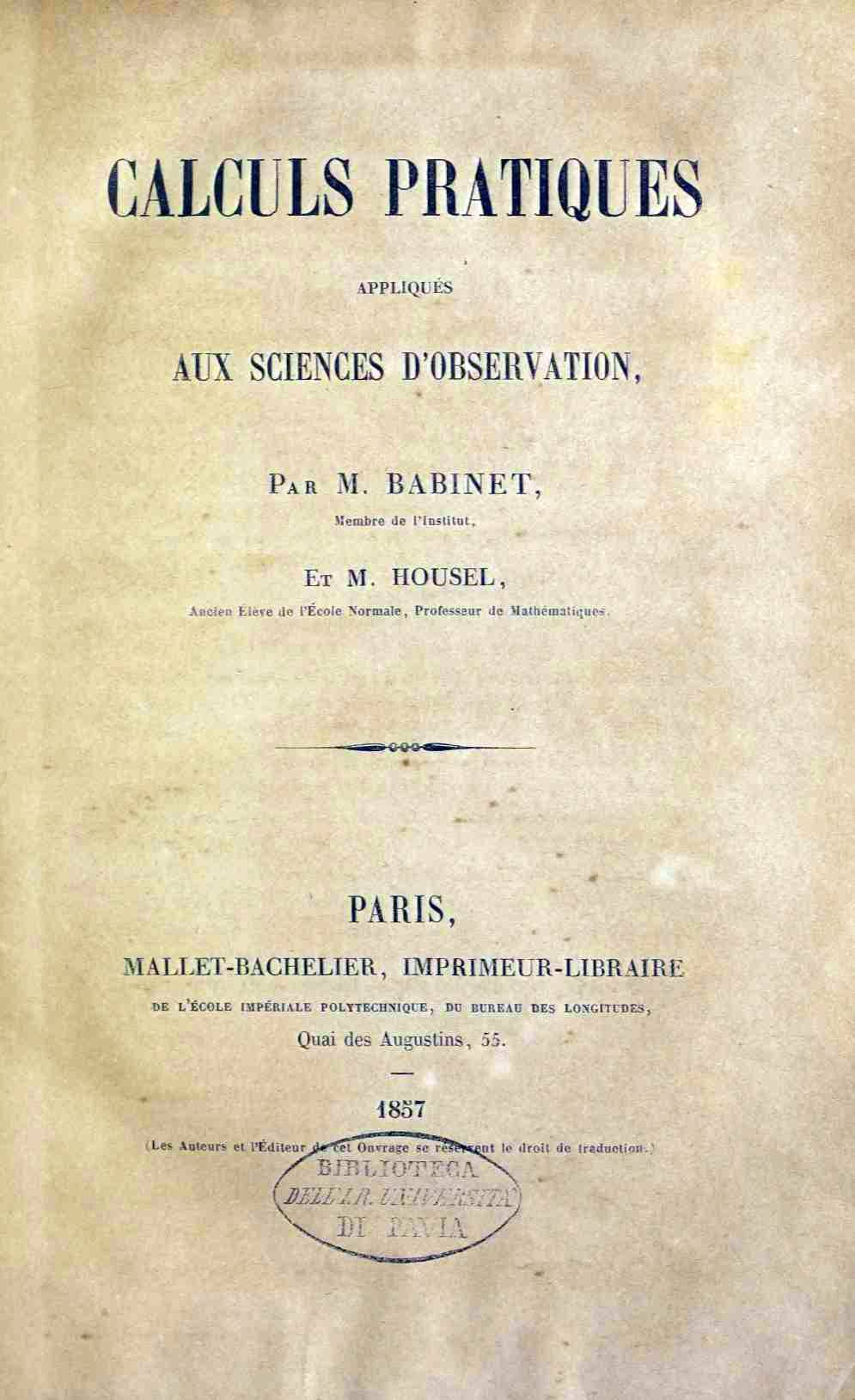
Calculs pratiques appliqués aux sciences d'observation, 1857

- Études et lectures sur les sciences d'observation et leurs applications pratiques (in French). Vol. 2. Paris: Mallet-Bachelier. 1856.
  - Études et lectures sur les sciences d'observation et leurs applications pratiques (in French). Vol. 3. Paris: Mallet-Bachelier. 1857.
  - Études et lectures sur les sciences d'observation et leurs applications pratiques (in French). Vol. 5. Paris: Mallet-Bachelier. 1858.
  - Études et lectures sur les sciences d'observation et leurs applications pratiques (in French). Vol. 6. Paris: Mallet-Bachelier. 1860.
  - Études et lectures sur les sciences d'observation et leurs applications pratiques (in French). Vol. 7. Paris: Mallet-Bachelier. 1863.
  - Études et lectures sur les sciences d'observation et leurs applications pratiques (in French). Vol. 8. Paris: Mallet-Bachelier. 1868.
- Calculs pratiques appliqués aux sciences d'observation (in French). Paris: Mallet-Bachelier. 1857.
