= Mikawa House =

Coordinates: 34.0664°N 134.5562°E

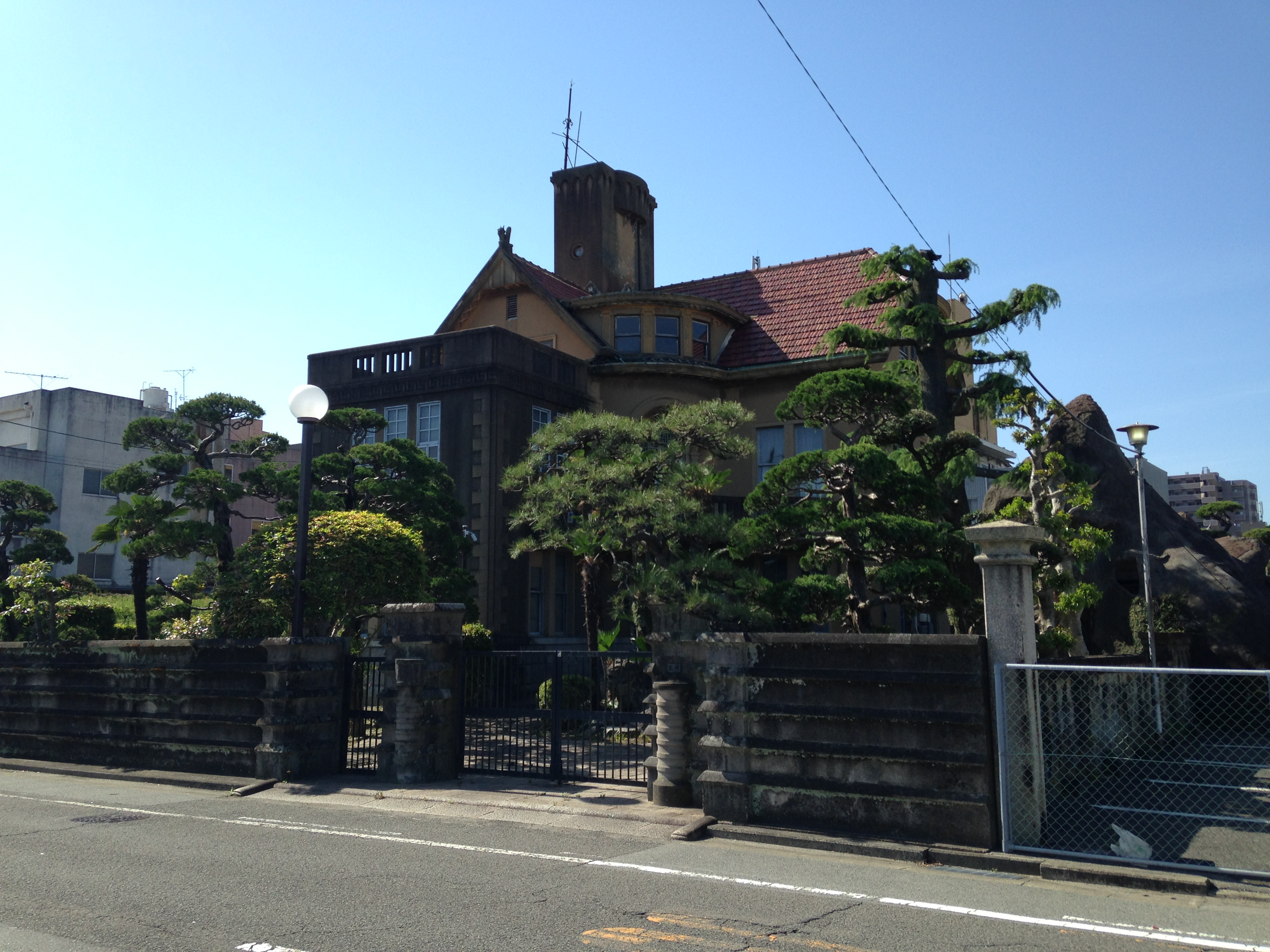
- Interactive map of the Mikawa House area

General information
- Location: Japan

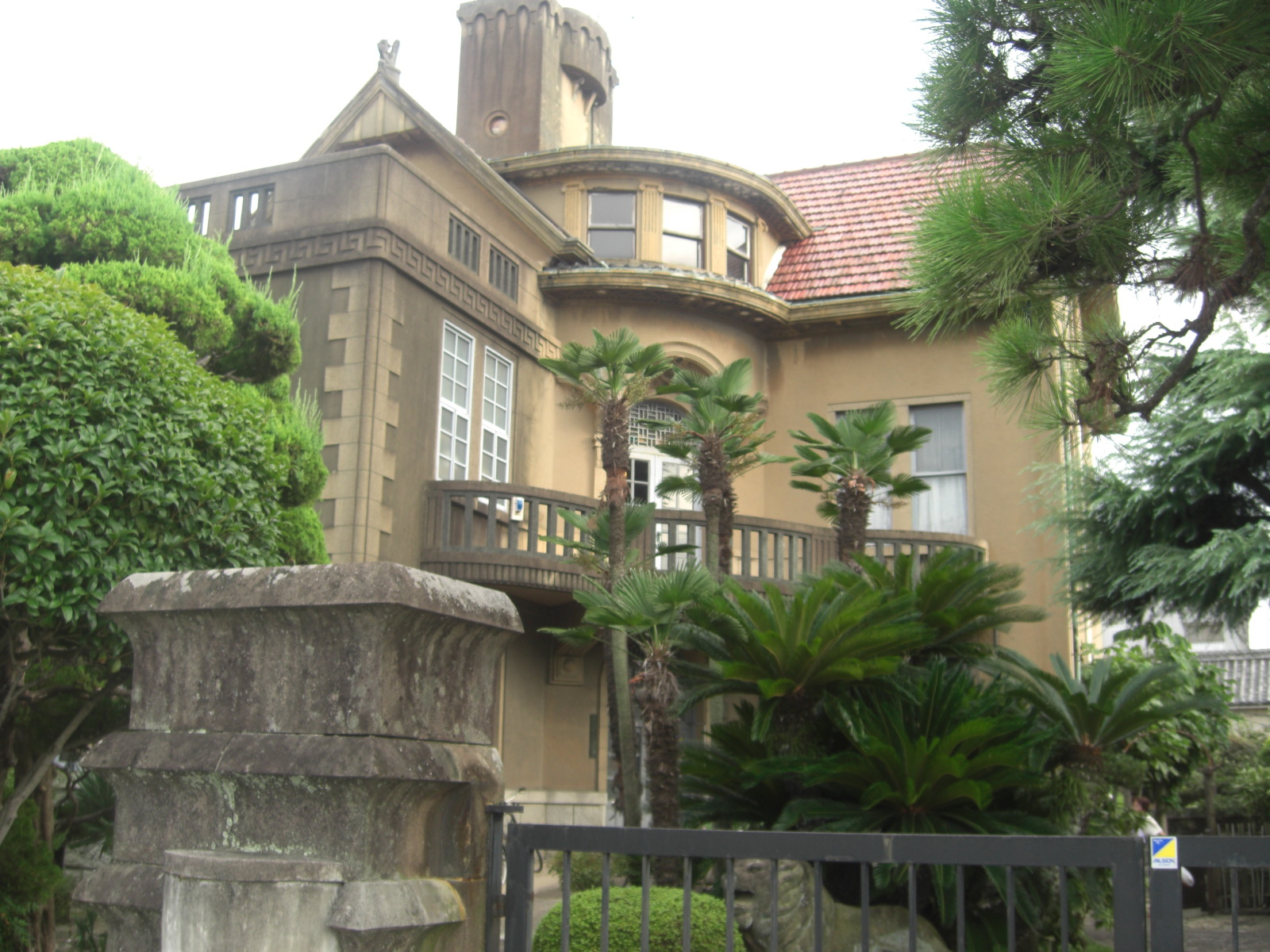
Mikawa House

Mikawa House (三河家住宅, Mikawa-ke jūtaku) is a historical building in Tokushima, Japan. It was designated an Important Cultural Property of Japan in 2007.

== History ==
In 1929, a doctor from Tokushima named Yoshiyuki Mikawa was studying abroad in Germany when he met Toyojirō Kiuchi, an architect of roughly the same age who was also from Tokushima. The two hit it off immediately and became close friends. After returning to Japan, Mikawa asked Kiuchi to design a house for him as proof of their friendship, and the result is what is now known in English as Mikawa House.

The building is notable for its German style, which was uncommon in Japan at the time. Made of reinforced concrete, it contains three floors as well as an observation tower and a wave-shaped terrace. With the Great Kantō earthquake fresh in the minds of architects at the time, Mikawa House was designed to not only be aesthetically appealing, but also physically sturdy. As an example of the evolution of modern architecture in Japan, Mikawa House was designated an Important Cultural Property on December 4, 2007. As of 2025 the building remains city-owned and is not generally open to the public, though its exterior remains viewable.

== See also ==
- Cultural Properties of Japan
- Important Cultural Properties of Japan
