= Architecture of Germany =

The view from Frankfurt Cathedral, showing the diversity of German architecture. Landmarks include the reconstructed Gothic Römer city hall and old town, the Neoclassical Paulskirche and the Modernist and Postmodernist skyscrapers of the Frankfurt skyline.

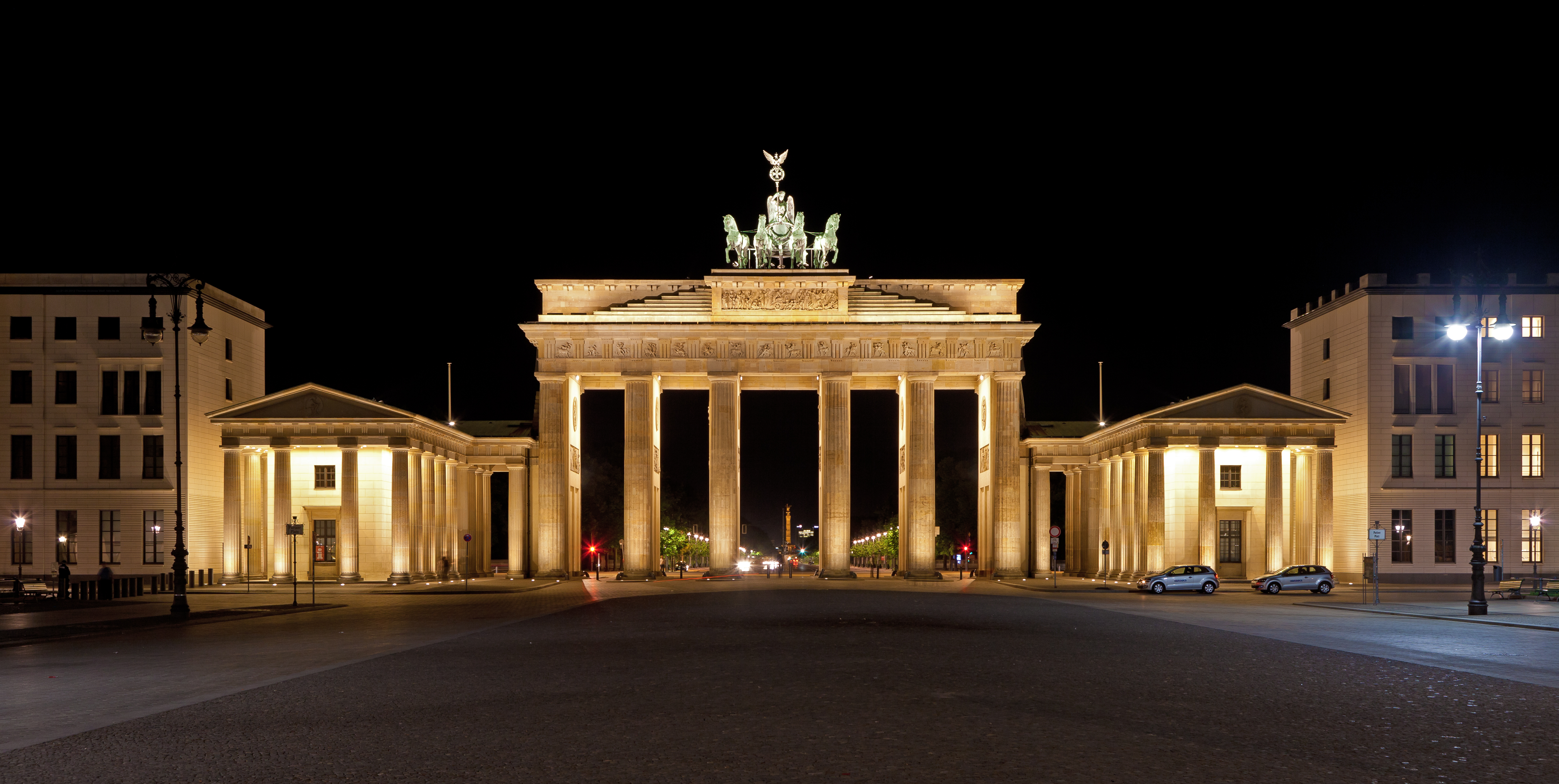
Brandenburg Gate in Berlin

The architecture of Germany has a long, rich and diverse history. Every major European style from Roman to Postmodern is represented, including renowned examples of Carolingian, Romanesque, Gothic, Renaissance, Baroque, Classical, Modern and International Style architecture.

Centuries of fragmentation of Germany into principalities and kingdoms caused a great regional diversity and favoured vernacular architecture. This made for a heterogeneous and diverse architectural style, with architecture differing from town to town. While this diversity may still be witnessed in small towns, the devastation of architectural heritage in the larger cities centres during World War II resulted partly in extensive rebuilding characterized by simple modernist architecture. In this context, however, it must be emphasized that many German cities had already changed their face in the course of industrialization in the 19th and 20th centuries with towns like Munich or Berlin developing from very small municipalities to major cities. Overall around 7 out of 10 buildings before World War II are still standing today, with even 40 % of Berlin´s buildings dating from before 1950.

German urban culture is therefore not only urban but is also shaped by medium-sized cities, rural small towns and large villages. From an architectural point of view, it is a generally recognized fact that the main centers are not representative of the whole country.

The Brandenburg Gate, Cologne Cathedral, St. Paul's Church (Frankfurt am Main), Neuschwanstein Castle, Hambach Castle, Wartburg and the Reichstag building are some of the most symbolic constructions of Germany.

== Prehistoric architecture ==
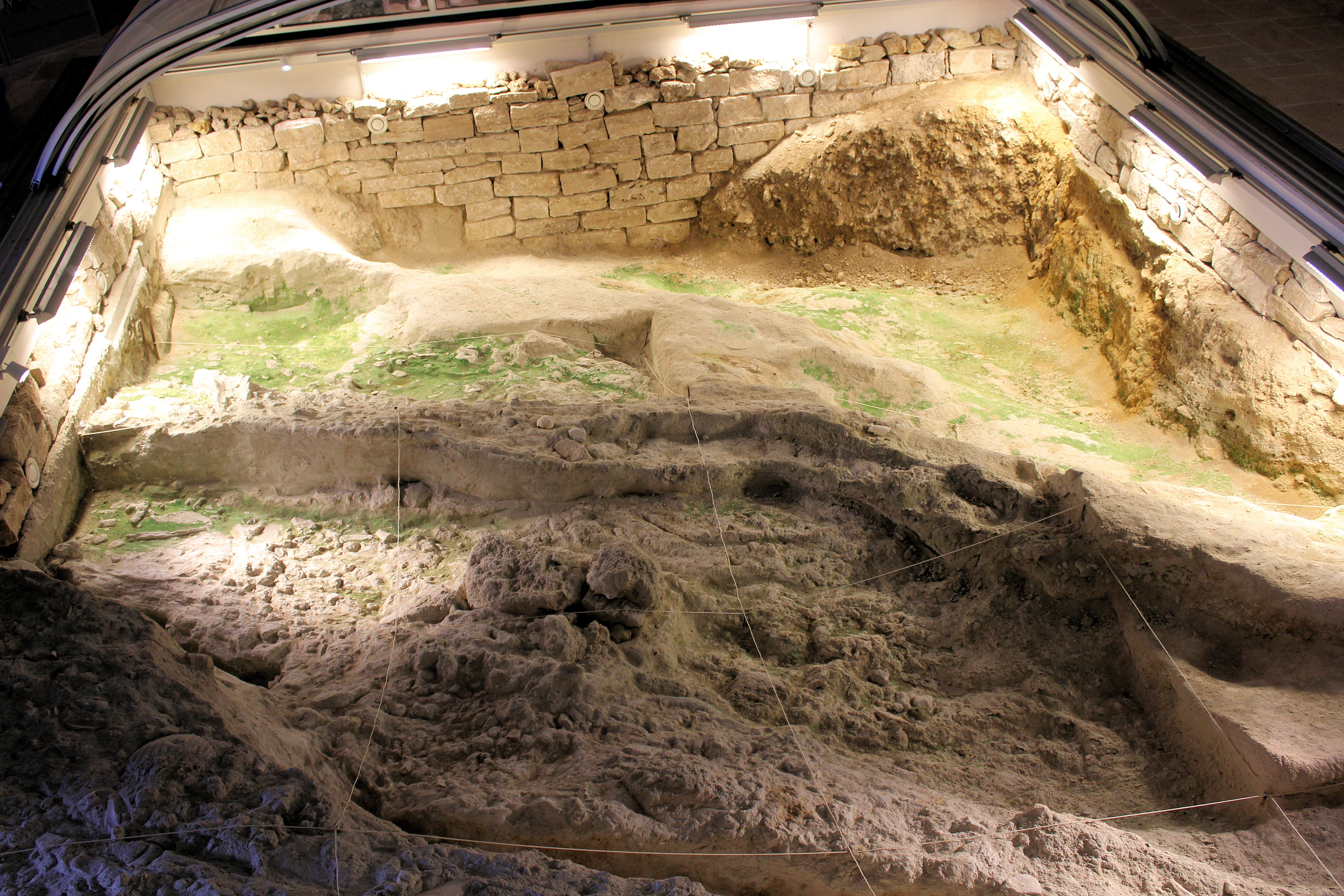
Bilzingsleben structure, possibly built by Homo heidelbergensis, 400–350.000 BCE.

One of the oldest buildings in the world was found in Bilzingsleben, dating to around 400.000 BP.

Starting with the Linear Pottery culture circular enclosures and long houses, the biggest buildings of their time, were erected in Germany, from around 5.000 BC.

The Unetice culture erected large burial mounds like the Leubingen tumulus and the graves in Helmsdorf and Bornhöck.

== Urnfield/Celtic architecture ==
By the late Bronze Age, the Urnfield culture (c. 1300 BC – c. 750 BC) had replaced the Bell Beaker, Unetice and Tumulus cultures in central Europe, whilst the Nordic Bronze Age had developed in Scandinavia and northern Germany. The Hallstatt culture, which had developed from the Urnfield culture, was the predominant Western and Central European culture from the 12th to 8th centuries BC and during the early Iron Age (8th to 6th centuries BC). It was followed by the La Tène culture (5th to 1st centuries BC).

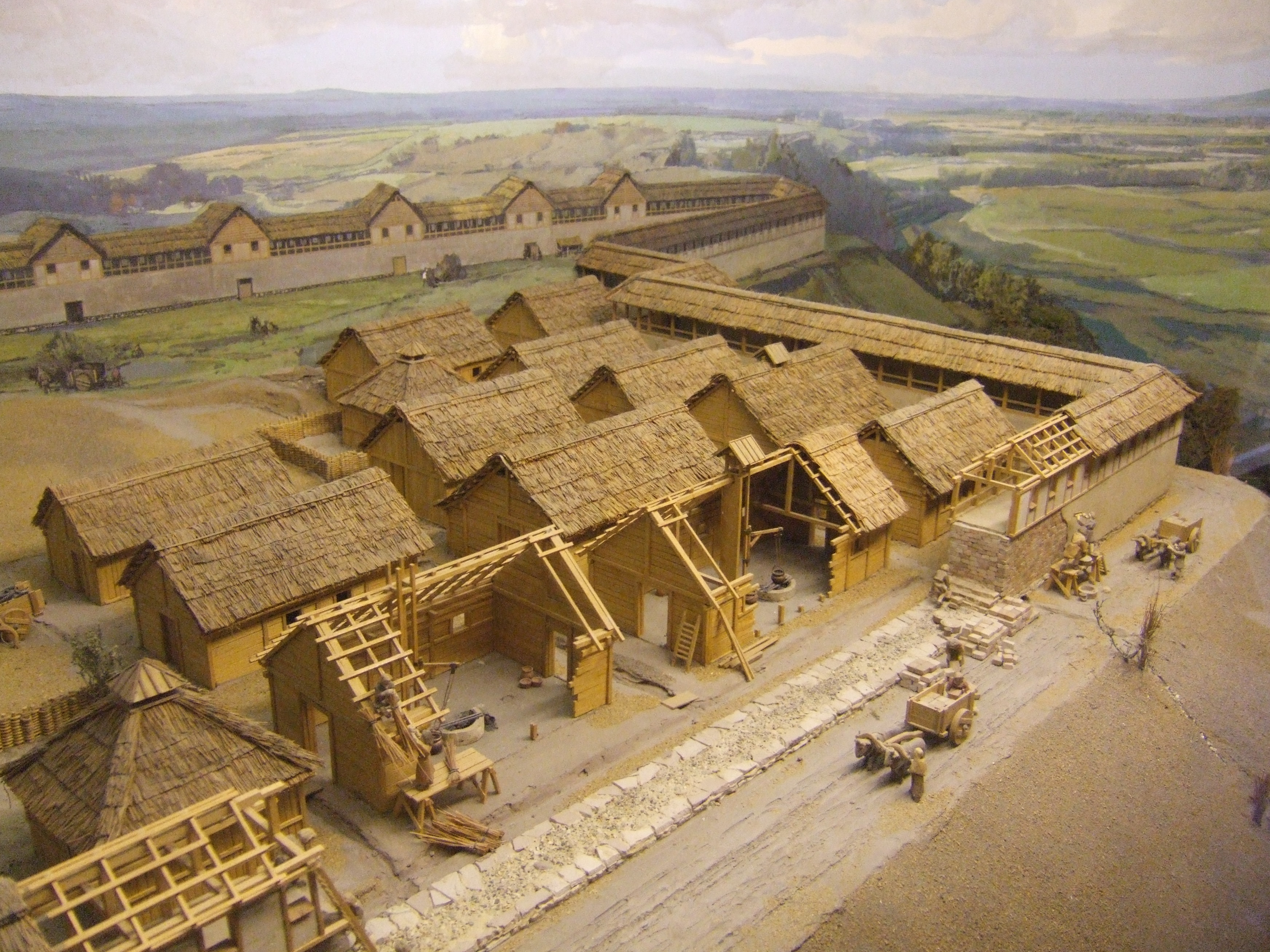
Model of the Heuneburg under construction, 7th century BC

The people who had adopted these cultural characteristics in central and southern Germany are regarded as Celts. How and if the Celts are related to the Urnfield culture remains disputed. However, Celtic cultural centres developed in central Europe during the late Bronze Age (c. 1200 BC until 700 BC). Some, like the Heuneburg, the oldest city north of the Alps, grew to become important cultural centres of the Iron Age in Central Europe, that maintained trade routes to the Mediterranean.

The Italic peoples, including the Latins, from which the Romans emerged, come from the Urnfield culture of central Europe. Later the Romans would return to Germany to erect buildings of the Roman architecture.

== Ancient Roman architecture ==
The Porta Nigra in Trier, 2nd century AD, one of the largest architectural relics from the Roman period

The Roman Empire once extended over much of today's Federal Republic of Germany, and there are still remains from around 100–150AD at the limes, the border defence system of Ancient Rome marking the boundaries of the Roman Empire. In addition to border fortifications such as forts and military camps, the Romans also built thermae, bridges, and amphitheatres.

An important metropolis of that time was Trier, where the Porta Nigra, the largest Roman city gate north of the Alps is located, together with the remains of various thermal spas, a Roman bridge, and the (largely reconstructed) Aula Palatina.

With the departure of the Romans, their urban culture and advances in architecture (e.g., underfloor heating, glass windows) vanished from Germany.

== Pre-Romanesque ==
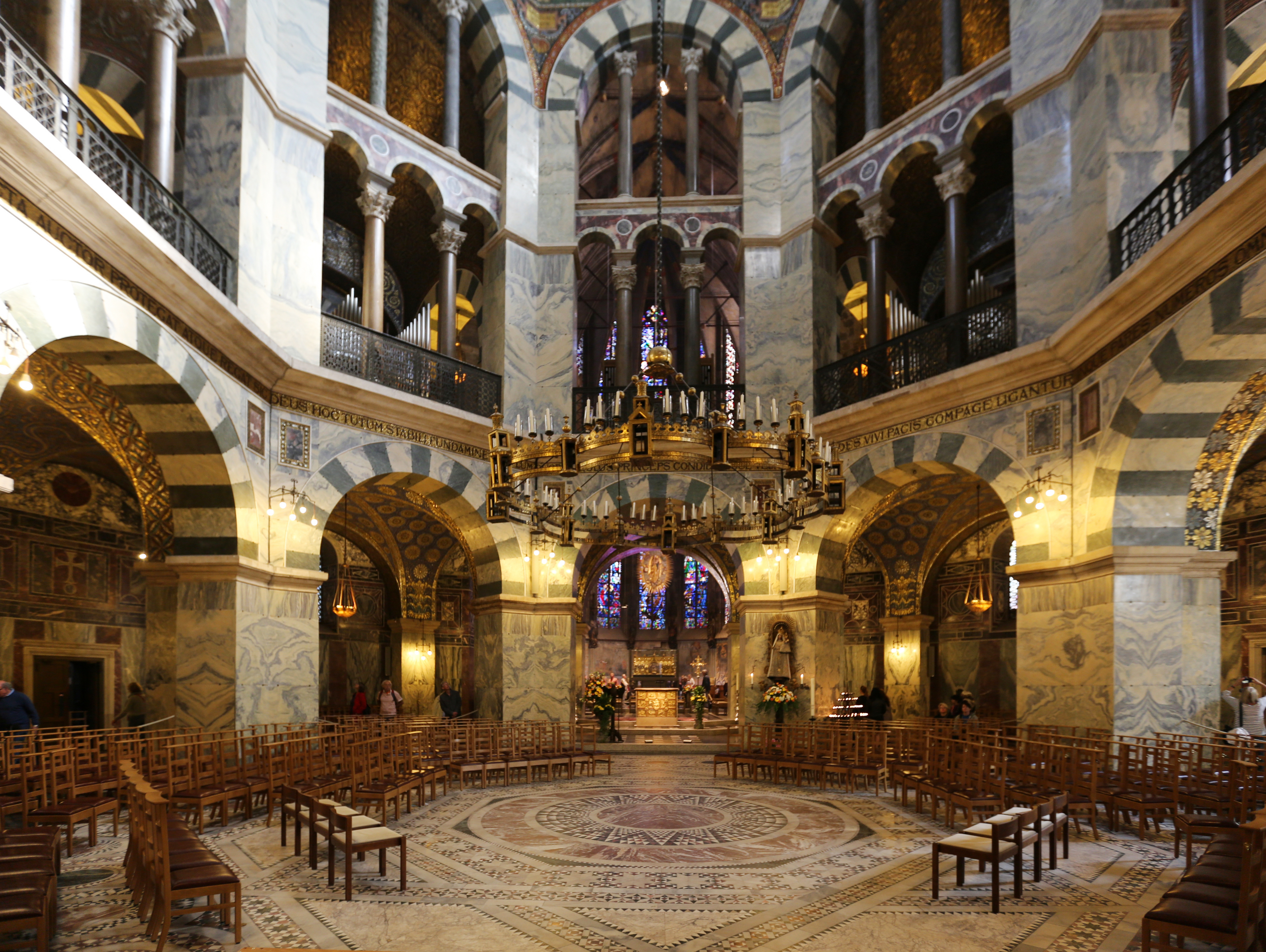
The Palatine Chapel, Aachen, built during the reign of the Carolingian emperor Charlemagne (r. 800–814 AD)

The Pre-Romanesque period in Western European architecture is usually dated from either the emergence of the Merovingian kingdom in about 500 or from the Carolingian Renaissance in the late 8th century, to the beginning of the 11th century Romanesque period. German buildings from this period include Lorsch Abbey. This combines elements of the Roman triumphal arch (arch-shaped passageways, half-columns) with the vernacular Teutonic heritage (baseless triangles of the blind arcade, polychromatic masonry).

One of the most important churches in this style is the Abbey Church of St. Michael's, constructed between 1001 and 1031 under the direction of Bishop Bernward of Hildesheim (993–1022) as the chapel of his Benedictine monastery. It is built in the so-called Ottonian (Early-Romanesque) style. The Ottonian Renaissance was a renaissance that accompanied the reigns of the first three emperors of the Saxon Dynasty, all named Otto: Otto I (936–973), Otto II (973–983), and Otto III (983–1002).

== Romanesque ==
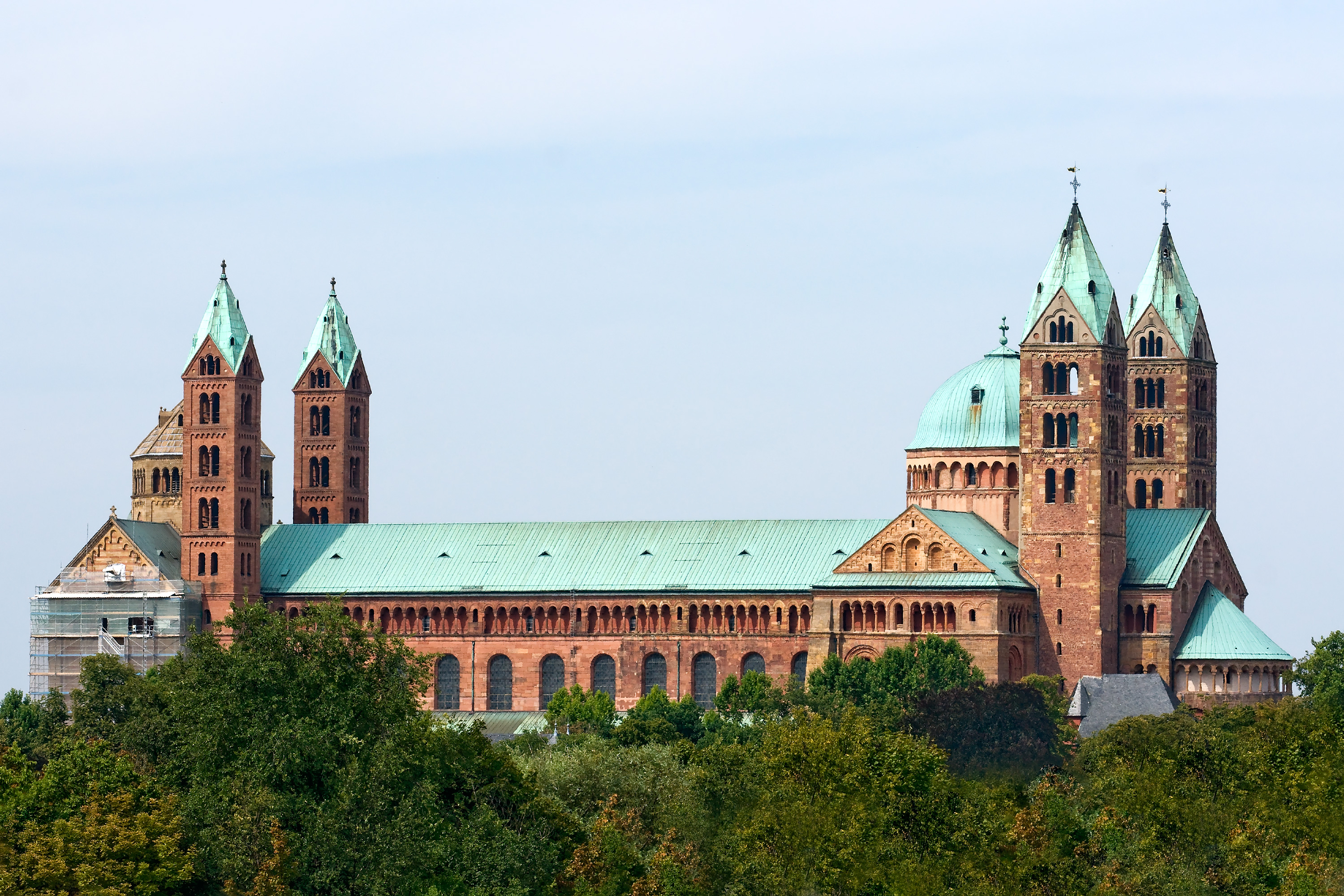
Speyer Cathedral

The Romanesque period, from the 10th to the early 13th century, is characterised by semi-circular arches, robust appearance, small paired windows, and groin vaults. Many churches in Germany date from this time, including the twelve Romanesque churches of Cologne. The most significant building of this period in Germany is the Speyer Cathedral. It was built in stages from about 1030, and was in the 11th century the largest building in the Christian world and an architectural symbol of the power of the Salian dynasty, a dynasty of four German Kings (1024–1125).

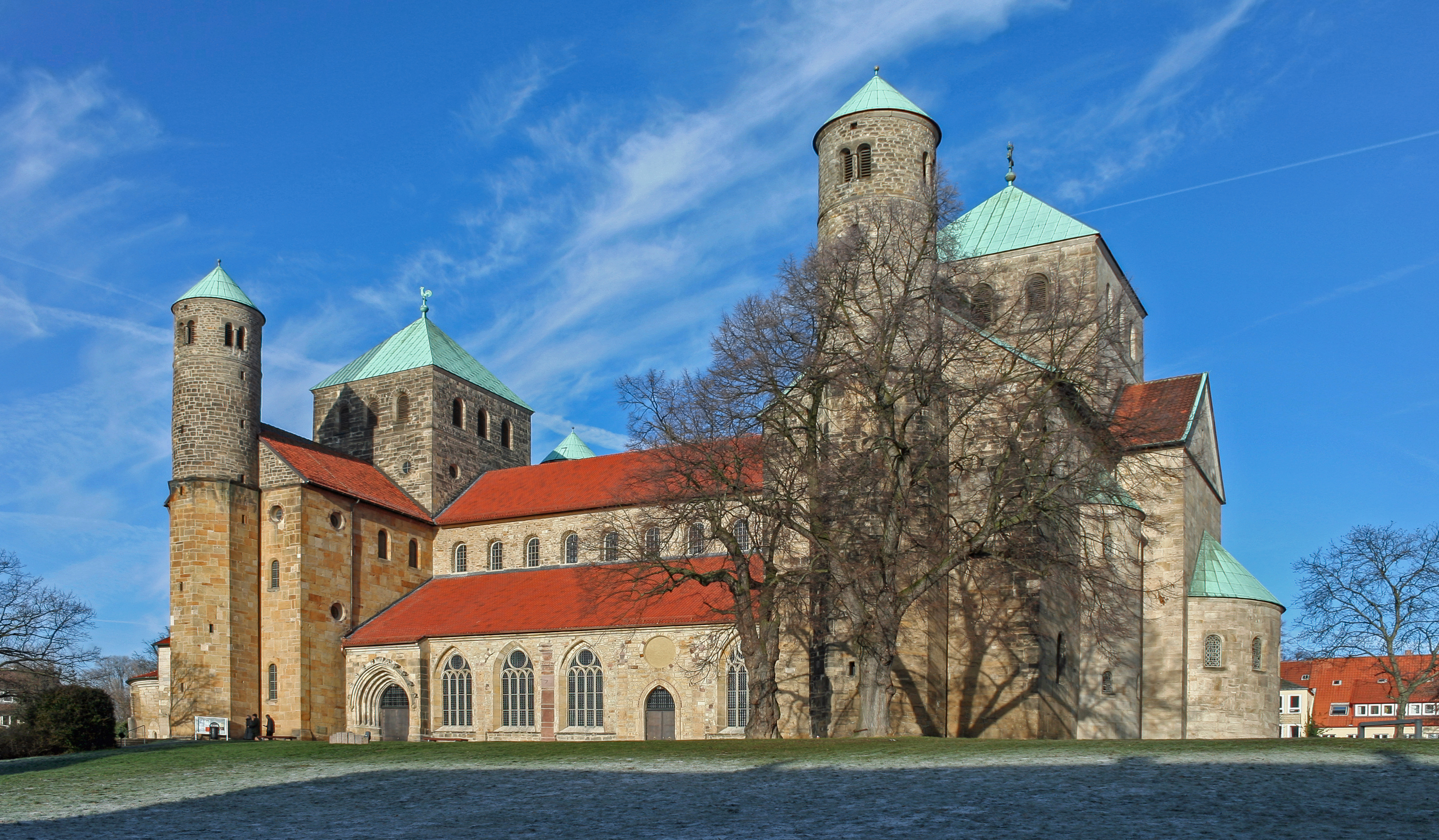
The Proto-Romanesque St. Michael's Church in Hildesheim

The cathedrals of Worms and Mainz are other important examples of Romanesque style. Many churches and monasteries were founded in this era, particularly in Saxony-Anhalt. The Rhenish Romanesque, for example at Limburg Cathedral, produced works that used coloured surrounds. Of particular importance are also the church of St. Servatius in Quedlinburg, and also Luebeck Cathedral, Brunswick Cathedral, St. Mary's Cathedral and St. Michael in Hildesheim, Trier Cathedral, Naumburg Cathedral and Bamberg Cathedral, whose last phase of construction falls in the Gothic period.

Maulbronn Abbey is considered a significant example of Cistercian architecture. It was built between the 12th and 15th centuries, and therefore includes Gothic elements. In the 11th century there also began construction of numerous castles, including the famous castle of Wartburg, which was later expanded in the Gothic style.

== Gothic ==
Gothic architecture flourished during the high and late medieval period. It evolved from Romanesque architecture. The first Gothic buildings in Germany were built from about 1230, for example the Liebfrauenkirche (German for Church of Our dear Lady) ca. 1233–1283 in Trier, which is one of the most important early Gothic cathedrals in Germany and falls into the architectural tradition of the French Gothic.

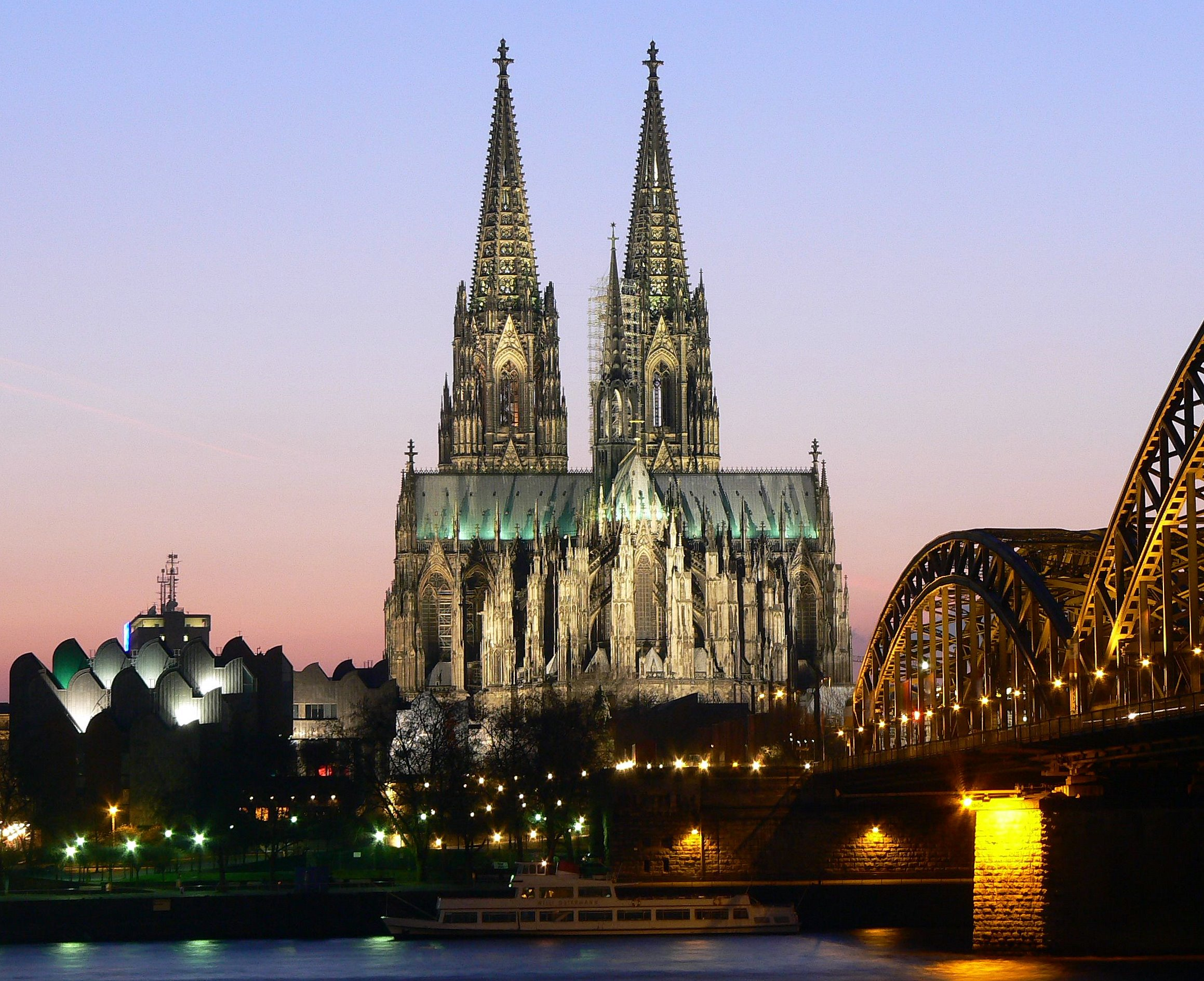
Cologne Cathedral

Freiburg Cathedral was built in three stages, the first beginning in 1120 under the dukes of Zähringen, the second beginning in 1210, and the third in 1230. Of the original building, only the foundations still exist. It is noted for its 116-metre tower, which Jacob Burckhardt reputedly claimed is the most beautiful in Christian architecture. The tower is nearly square at the base, and at its centre is the dodecagonal star gallery. Above this gallery, the tower is octagonal and tapered, with the spire above. It is the only Gothic church tower in Germany that was completed in the Middle Ages (1330), and survived the bombing raids of November 1944, which destroyed all of the houses on the west and north side of the market.

Cologne Cathedral is after Milan Cathedral the largest Gothic cathedral in the world. Construction began in 1248 and took, with interruptions, until 1880 to complete – a period of over 600 years. It is 144.5 metres long, 86.5 m wide and its two towers are 157 m tall. Because of its enormous twin spires, it also has the largest façade of any church in the world. The choir of the cathedral, measured between the piers, also holds the distinction of having the largest height to width ratio of any Medieval church, 3.6:1, exceeding even Beauvais Cathedral which has a slightly higher vault.

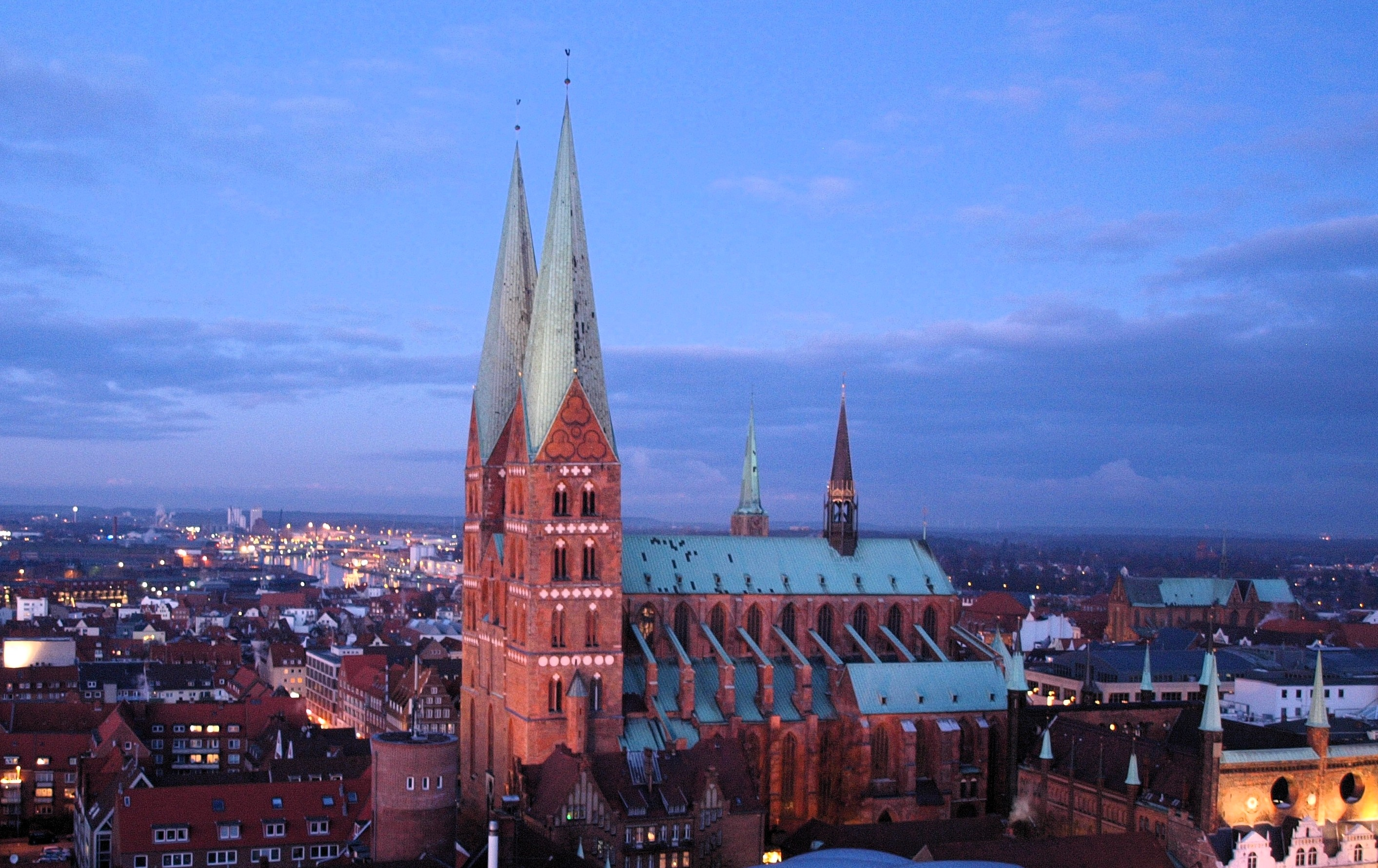
St. Mary's Church in Lübeck, Germany with red and varnished brick, edges of granite and cornices of limestone

Brick Gothic (German: Backsteingotik) is a specific style of Gothic architecture common in Northern Europe, especially in Northern Germany and the regions around the Baltic Sea without natural rock resources. The buildings are built more or less using only bricks. Stralsund City Hall and St. Nicholas Church are good examples of this style. Cities such as Lübeck, Rostock, Wismar, Stralsund, Greifswald, and Szczecin (Stettin), Kołobrzeg (Kolberg), Gdańsk (Danzig) in present-day northern and western Poland, regions that had been German-settled since the Middle Ages, are shaped by this regional style. A model for many North German churches was St. Mary's in Lübeck, built between 1200 and 1350.

The building of Gothic churches was accompanied by the construction of the guild houses and the construction of town halls by the rising bourgeoisie. A good example is the Gothic Town Hall (13th century) at Stralsund. There is also Bremen Town Hall (1410) and the (reconstructed) city hall of Münster (originally from 1350).

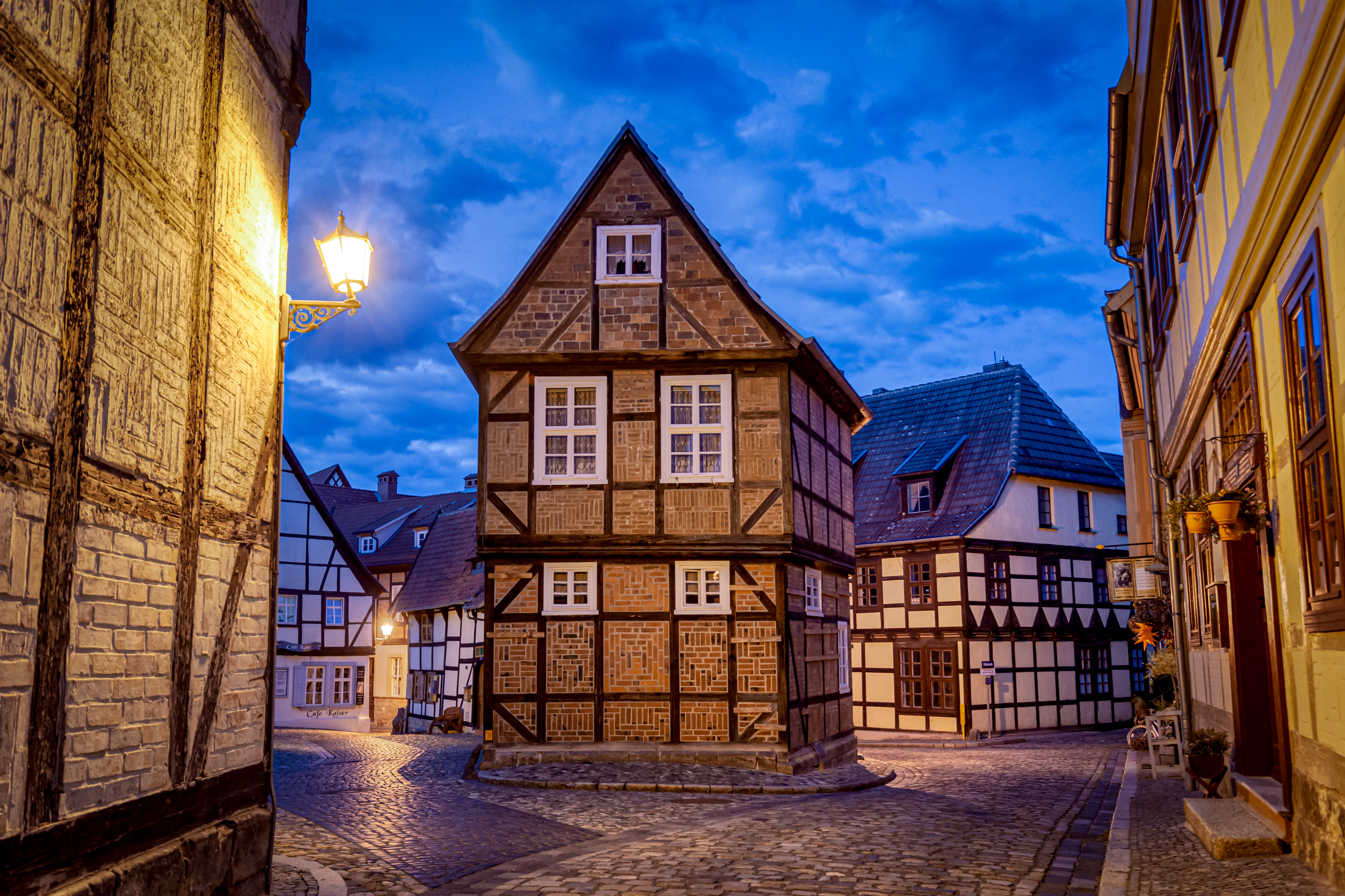
Old town of Quedlinburg with 2.100 timber houses.

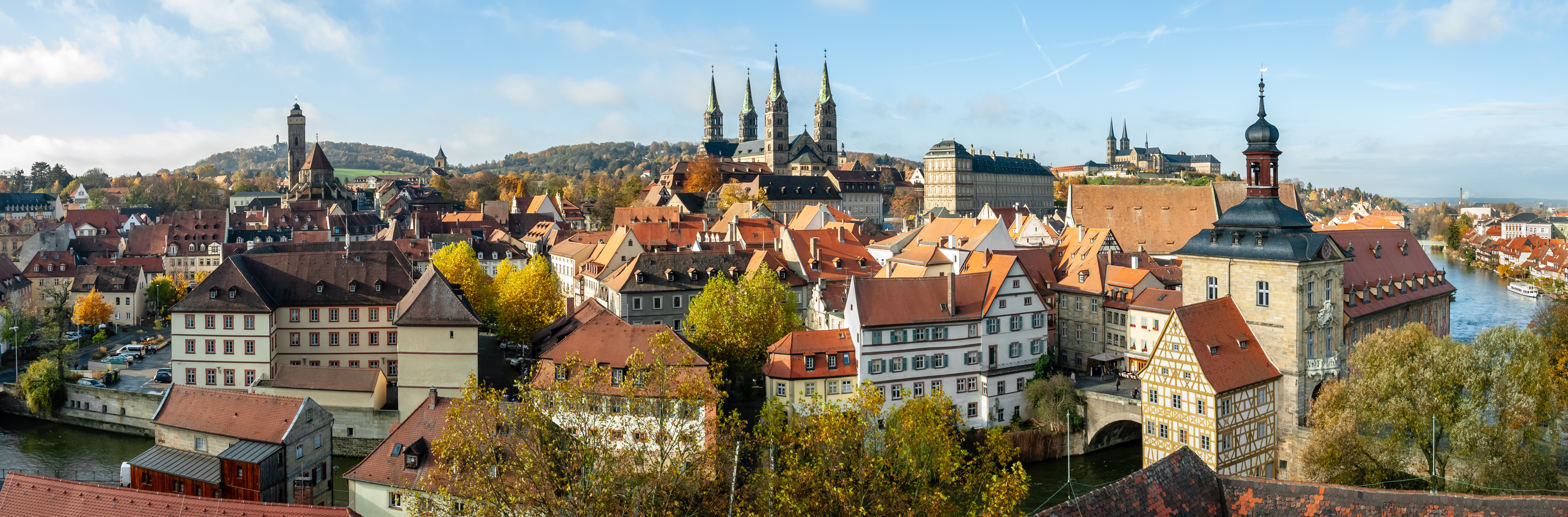
Old town of Bamberg with 2.400 timber houses.

The dwellings of this period were mainly timber-framed buildings, as can still be seen in Goslar and Quedlinburg. Quedlinburg has one of the oldest half-timbered houses in Germany. The method of construction, used extensively for town houses of the Medieval and Renaissance periods, (see Dornstetten, illustrated above) lasted into the 20th century for rural buildings. There are around 2.4 million timber framed buildings in Germany.

== Renaissance ==
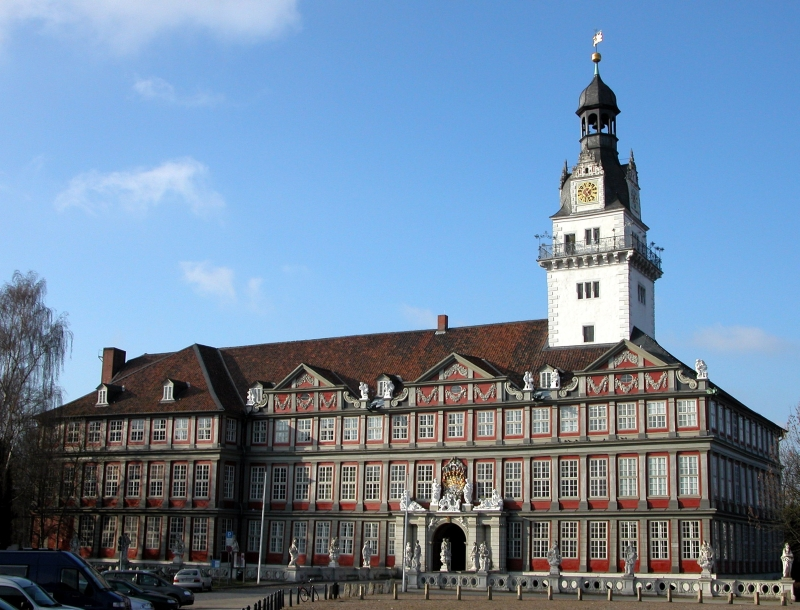
The Schloss Wolfenbüttel

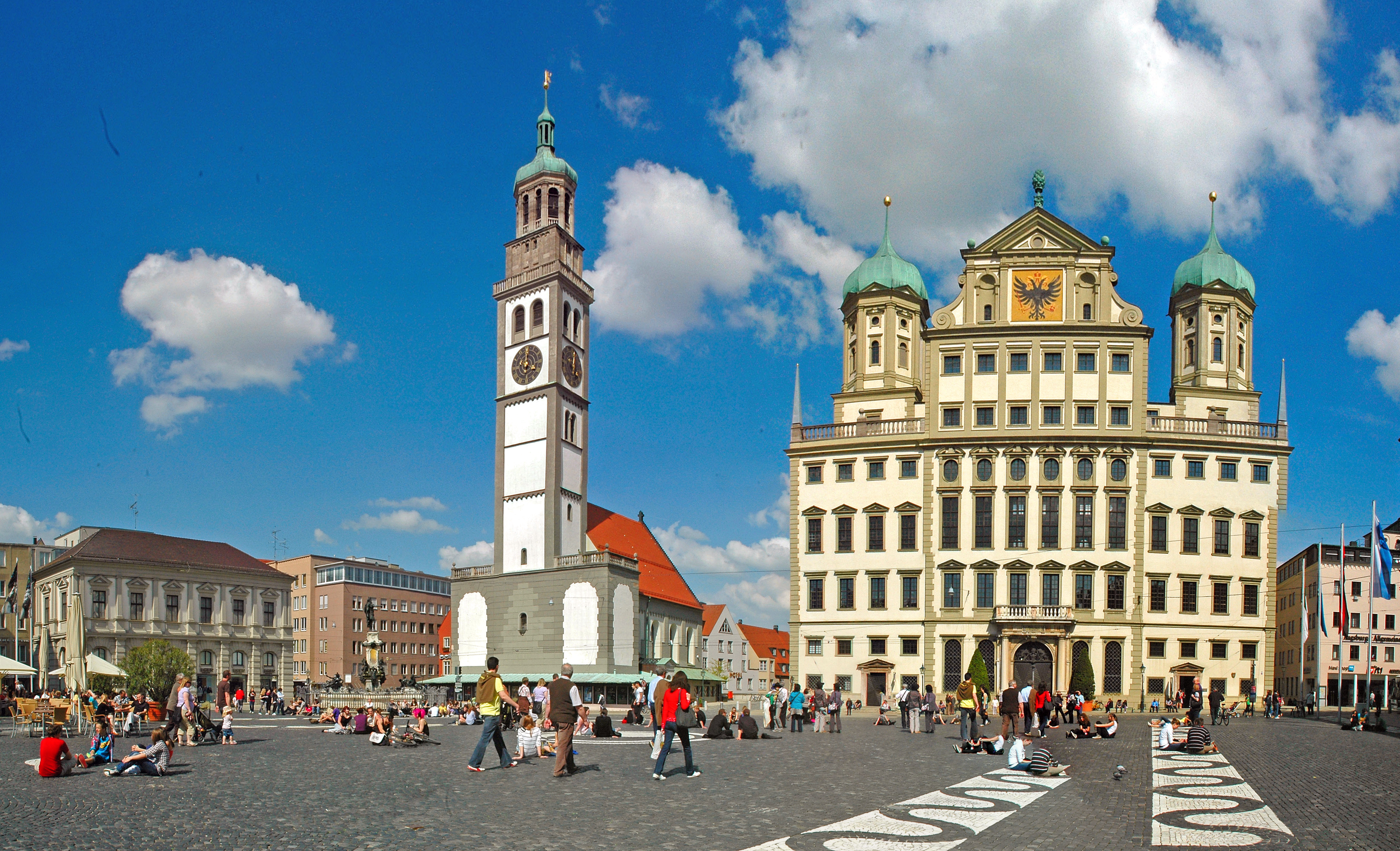
Augsburg town hall on the right in Augsburg, an early centre of capitalism and centre of power in the Renaissance

Renaissance architecture belongs to the period between the early 14th and early 16th centuries in different parts of Europe, when there was a conscious revival and development of certain elements of ancient Greek and Roman thought and culture. The earliest example of Renaissance architecture in Germany is the Fugger chapel in St. Anne's Church, Augsburg. At that time, Germany was fragmented into numerous principalities, the citizens generally had few rights and armed conflict, especially the religious conflicts of the Protestant Reformation, ensured that large tracts of land remained virtually undeveloped.

Some princes, however, promoted modern art, for example in Torgau, Aschaffenburg, and Landshut, where the Renaissance era originated. Examples include the decorated inner courtyard of Trausnitz Castle and the ducal Landshut Residence in the inner city, built by Italian Renaissance master craftsmen.

The St. Michael's Church in Munich, (begun around 1581), is an important Renaissance building. There is also Heidelberg Castle with its typical Renaissance façades, and the Augsburg City Hall, built from 1614 to 1620 by the Augsburg architect Elias Holl.

In the area of the Weser there are numerous castles and manor houses in Weser Renaissance style. In Wolfenbüttel, the castle of the Guelphs and the Evangelical town church Beatae-Maria-Virginis are worth mentioning as special examples of the Renaissance. In Thuringia and Saxony, many churches and palaces in the Renaissance style were built, for example, William Castle with castle in Schmalkalden, the church of Rudolstadt, the Castle of Gotha, the Old Town Hall in Leipzig, the interior of the presbytery, the Freiberg Cathedral, the Castle in Dresden or the Schönhof in Gorlitz. In northern Germany there is Güstrower Castle and the rich interior of Stralsund's Nikolai Church.

== Baroque ==
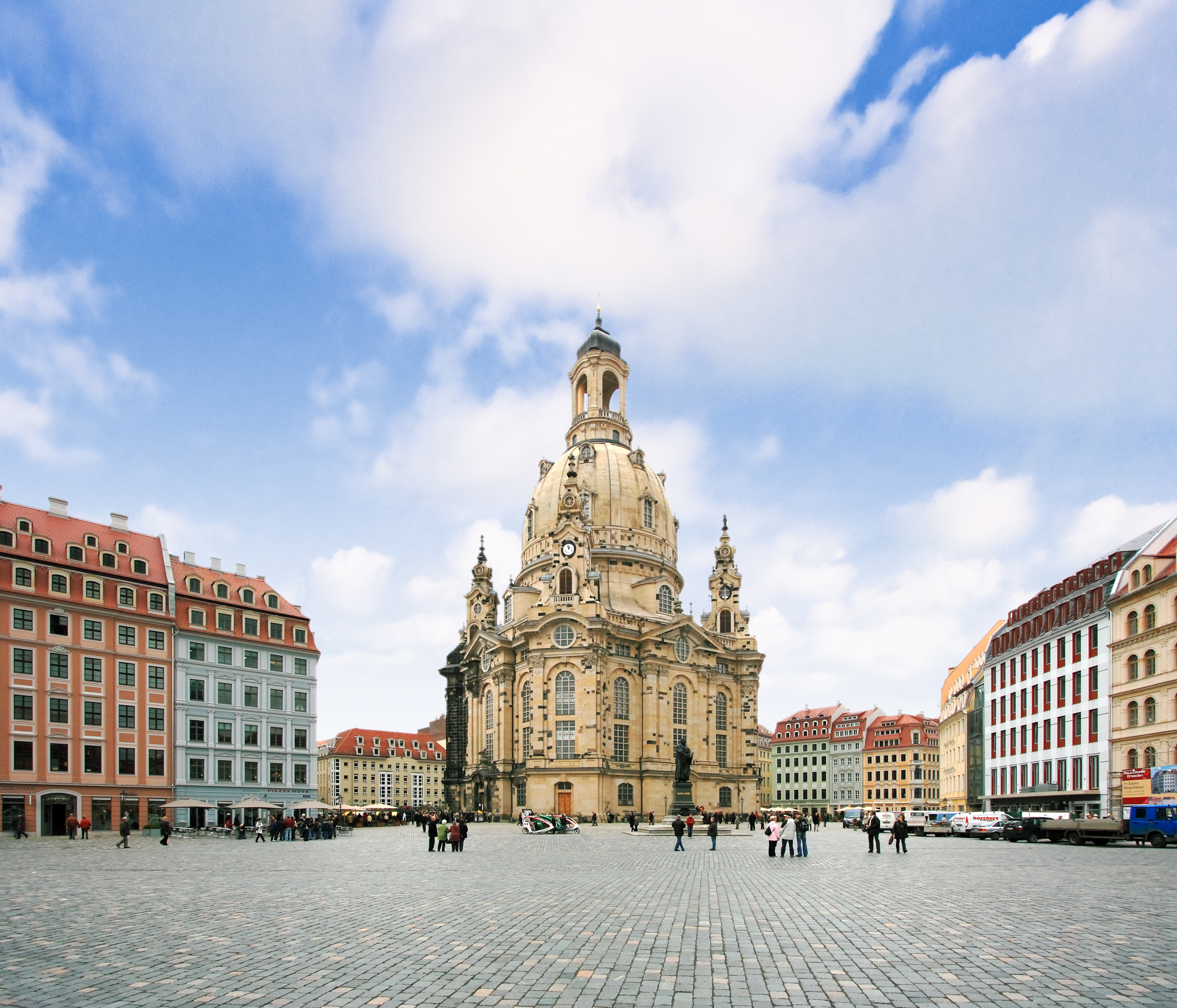
Frauenkirche, Dresden

Baroque architecture began in the early 17th century in Italy, reinventing the humanist vocabulary of Renaissance architecture in a new rhetorical, theatrical, sculptural fashion, expressing the triumph of absolutist church and state. Whereas the Renaissance drew on the wealth and power of the Italian courts, and was a blend of secular and religious forces, the Baroque was directly linked to the Counter-Reformation, a movement within the Catholic Church to reform itself in response to the Protestant Reformation.

The Baroque style arrived in Germany after the Thirty Years War. The Baroque architecture of the German government royal and princely houses was based on the model of France, especially the court of Louis XIV at Versailles. Examples are the Zwinger Palace in Dresden, built by Matthäus Daniel Pöppelmann from 1709 to 1728, initially for the holding of court festivals. The architecture of absolutism always put the ruler at the centre, thus increasing the spatial composition, for example, the power of the ruler – perhaps in the form of the magnificent staircase leading to the person of the ruler.

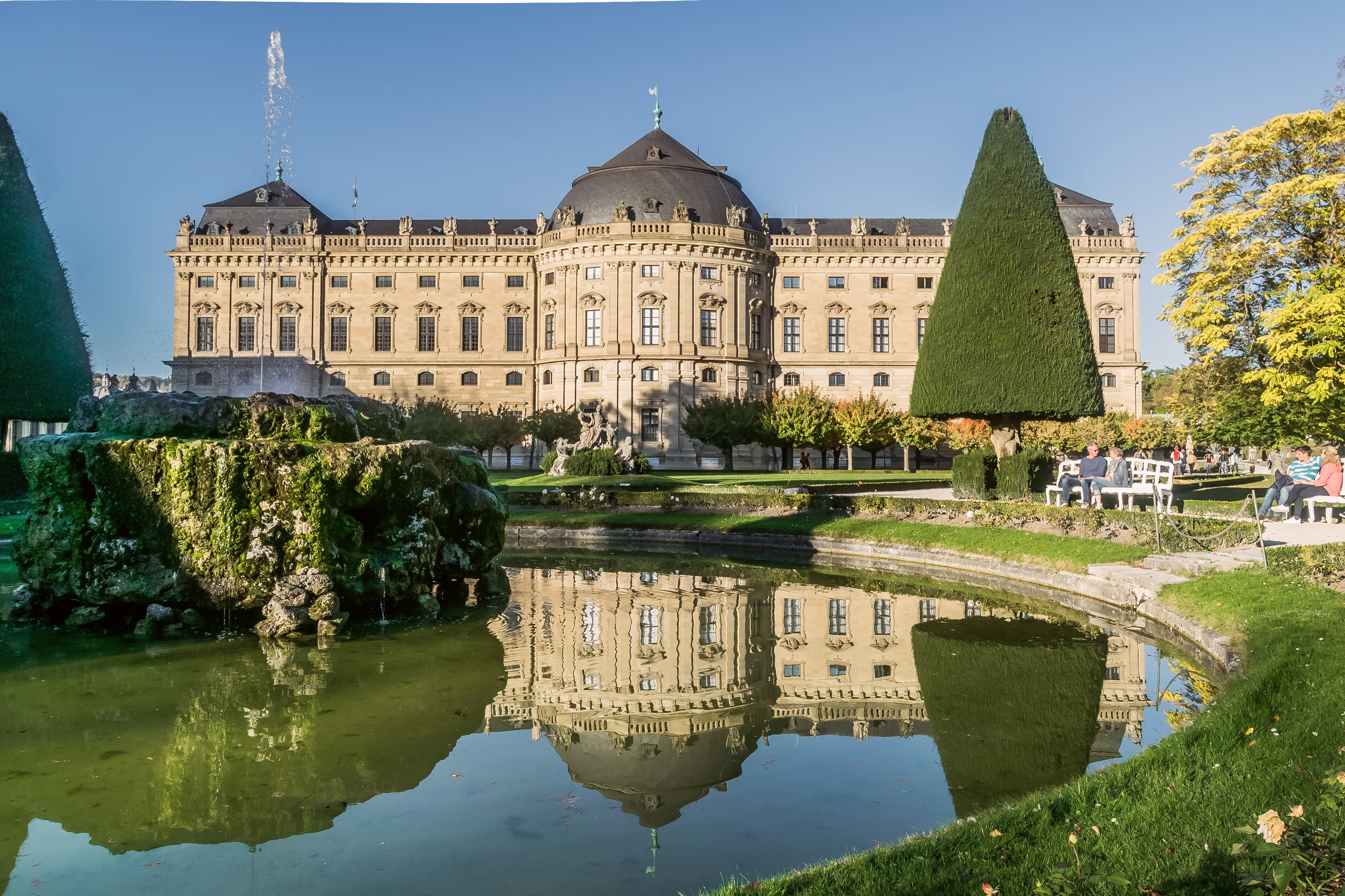
The Würzburg Residence

The interaction of architecture, painting and sculpture is an essential feature of Baroque architecture. An important example is the Würzburg Residence with the Emperor's Hall and the staircase, whose construction began under the leadership of Johann Balthasar Neumann in 1720. The frescoes over the staircase were painted by Giovanni Battista Tiepolo from 1751 to 1753.

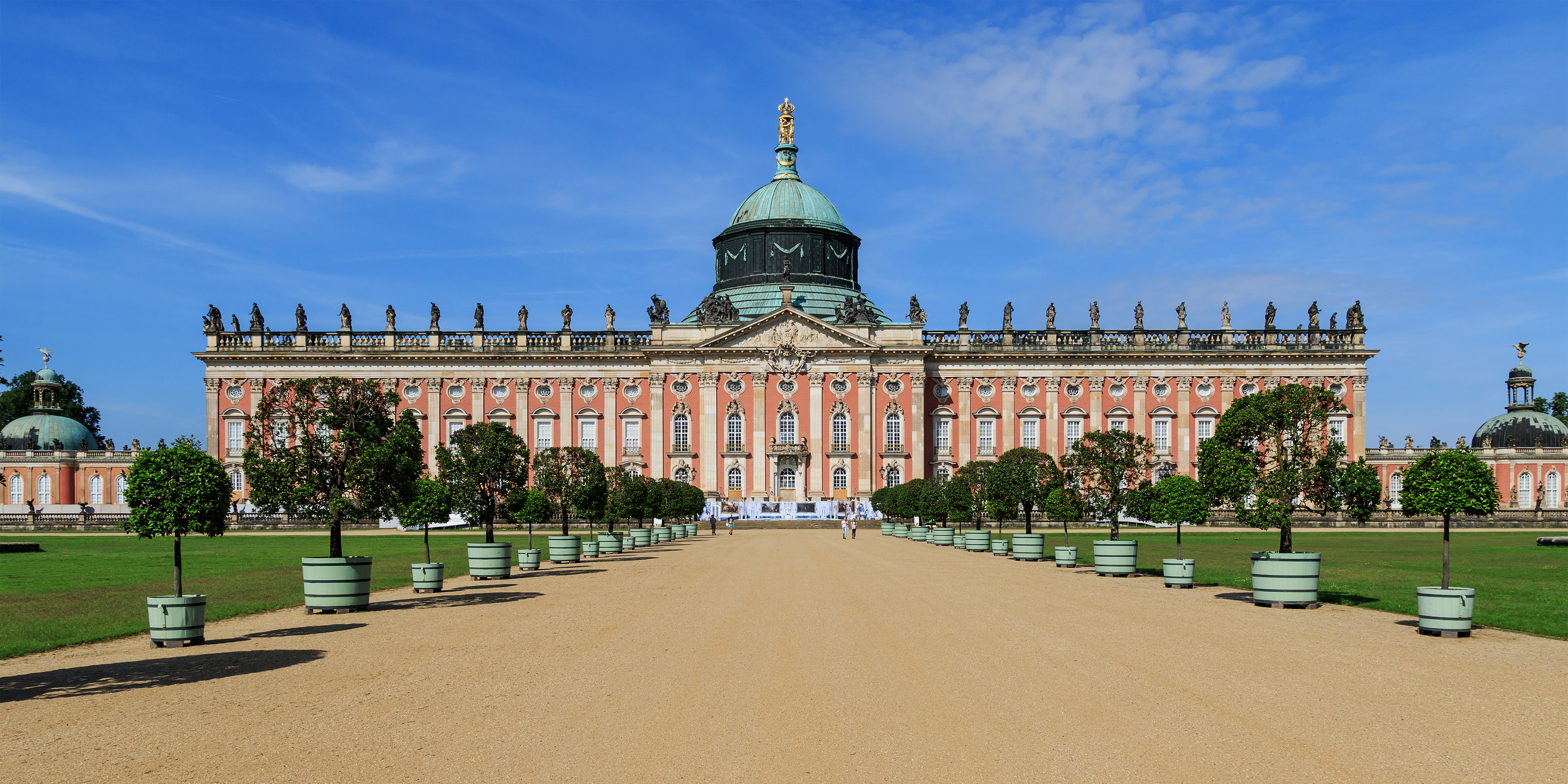
New Palace in Potsdam

Other well-known Baroque palaces are the New Palace in Potsdam, Schloss Charlottenburg in Berlin, Schloss Weißenstein in Pommersfelden and Augustusburg Castle in Brühl, whose interiors are partly in the Rococo style. Rococo is the late phase of the Baroque, in which the decoration became even more abundant and showed most colors in even brighter tones. For example, Sanssouci Palace, built from 1745 to 1747, which was the former summer palace of Frederick the Great, King of Prussia, in Potsdam, near Berlin.

The most well-known examples of Bavarian Baroque include the Benedictine abbey in Ottobeuren, the Weltenburg and the Ettal Abbey, and the Asam Church in Munich.

Other examples of Baroque church architecture are the Basilica of the Vierzehnheiligen in Upper Franconia and the rebuilt Frauenkirche in Dresden, created by George Bähr between 1722 and 1743.

See also: Liège–Aachen Baroque furniture, Baroque in Prince-Bishopric of Liège

== Classicism ==
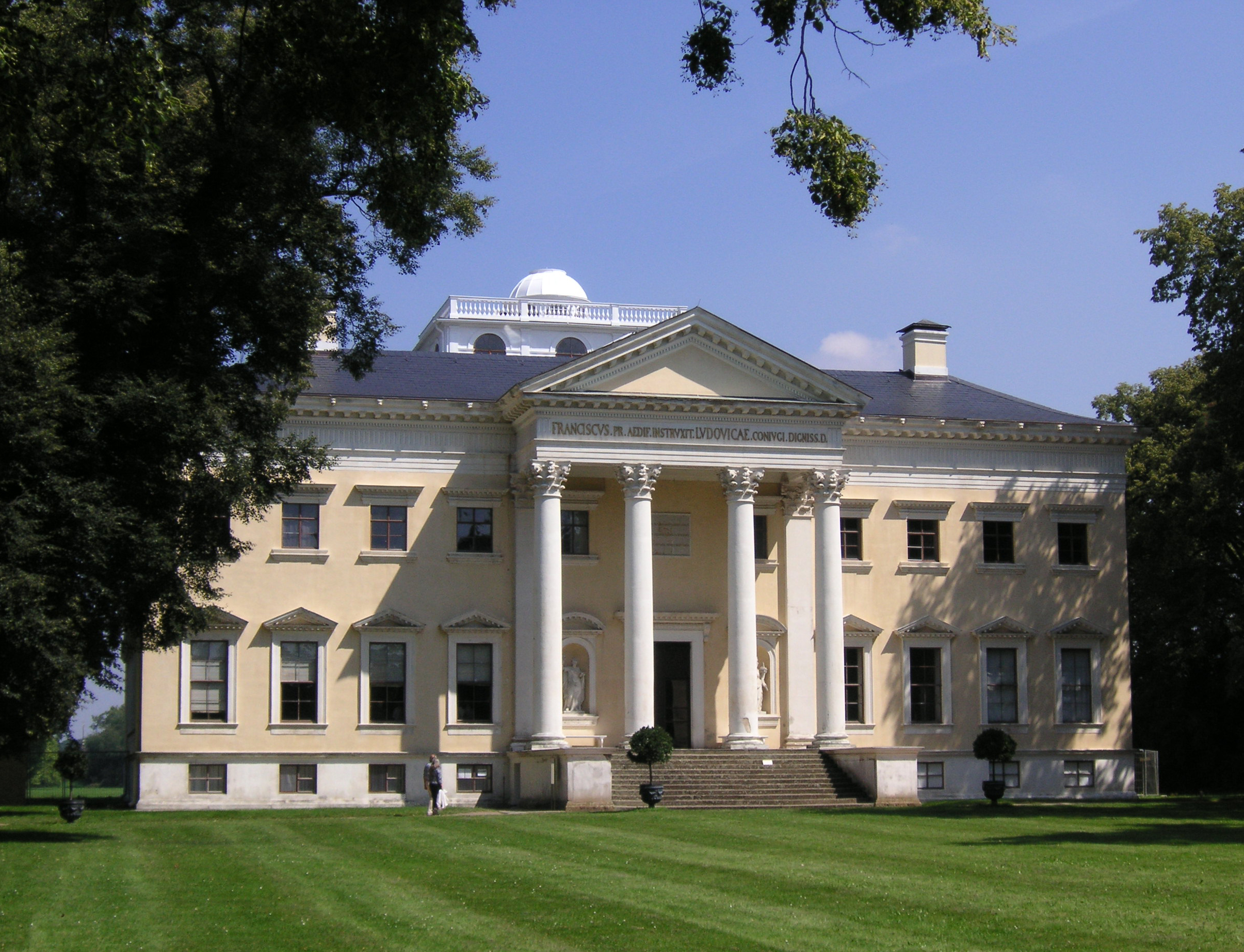
Wörlitz Palace

Classicism arrived in Germany in the second half of the 18th century. It drew inspiration from the classical architecture of antiquity and was a reaction against the Baroque style, in both architecture and landscape design.

The Dessau-Wörlitz Garden Realm is one of the first and largest English parks in Germany. It was created in the late 18th century under the regency of Duke Leopold III of Anhalt-Dessau (1740–1817), after returning from a Grand Tour to Italy, the Netherlands, England, France and Switzerland which he had taken together with his architect friend Friedrich Wilhelm von Erdmannsdorff. Unlike the formal Baroque gardens, it celebrated the naturalistic manner of the English landscape garden and symbolised the promised freedom of the Enlightenment era.

The Brandenburg Gate in Berlin, commissioned by King Frederick William II of Prussia as a sign of peace and completed by Carl Gotthard Langhans in 1791, is arguably one of the most famous monuments of classicism in Germany. The Brandenburg Gate was restored from 2000 to 2002 by the Stiftung Denkmalschutz Berlin (Berlin Monument Conservation Foundation). It is now considered one of Europe's most famous landmarks.

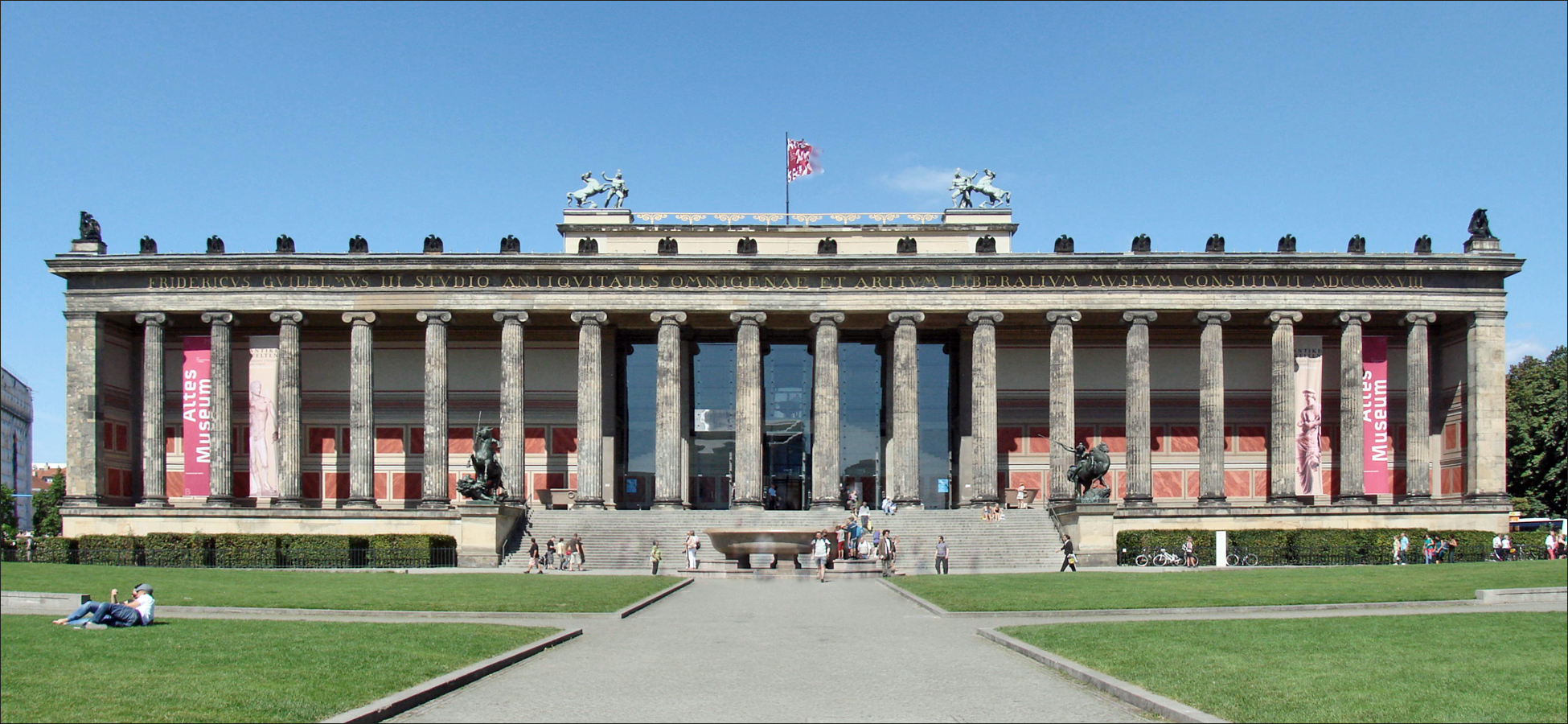
Altes Museum (Old museum) on Museum Island in Berlin

The most important architect of this style in Germany was undoubtedly Karl Friedrich Schinkel. Schinkel's style, in his most productive period, is defined by its appeal to Greek rather than Roman architecture, avoiding the style that was linked to the recent French occupiers. His most famous buildings are found in and around Berlin. These include Neue Wache (1816–1818), the Schauspielhaus (1819–1821) at the Gendarmenmarkt, which replaced the earlier theatre that was destroyed by fire in 1817, and the Altes Museum (old museum, see photo) on Museum Island (1823–1830).

Leo von Klenze (1784–1864) was a court architect of Bavarian King Ludwig I, another prominent representative of the Greek Revival style. Ludwig's passion for Hellenism inspired the architectural style of von Klenze, who built many neoclassical buildings in Munich, including the Ruhmeshalle and the Monopteros in the Englischer Garten. On Königsplatz he designed probably the best known modern Hellenistic architectural ensemble.

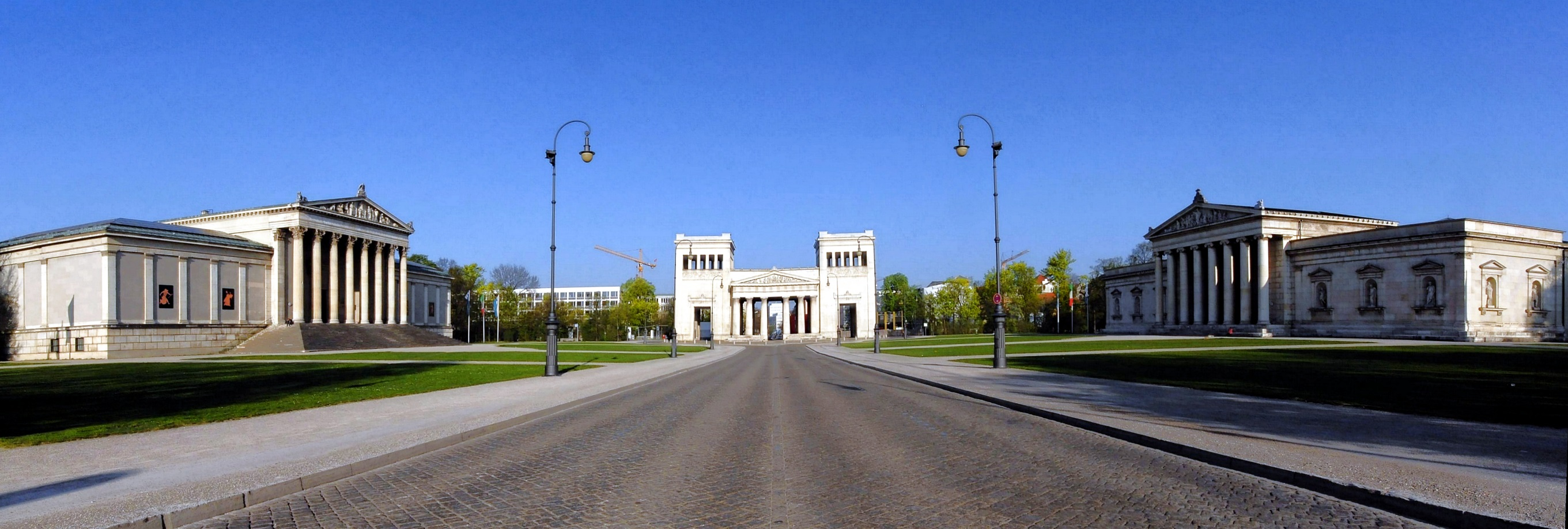
The Königsplatz, Munich

Near Regensburg he built the Walhalla temple, named after Valhalla, the home of the gods in Norse mythology.

Another important building of the period is Wilhelm Castle in Kassel (begun 1786).

== Historicism ==
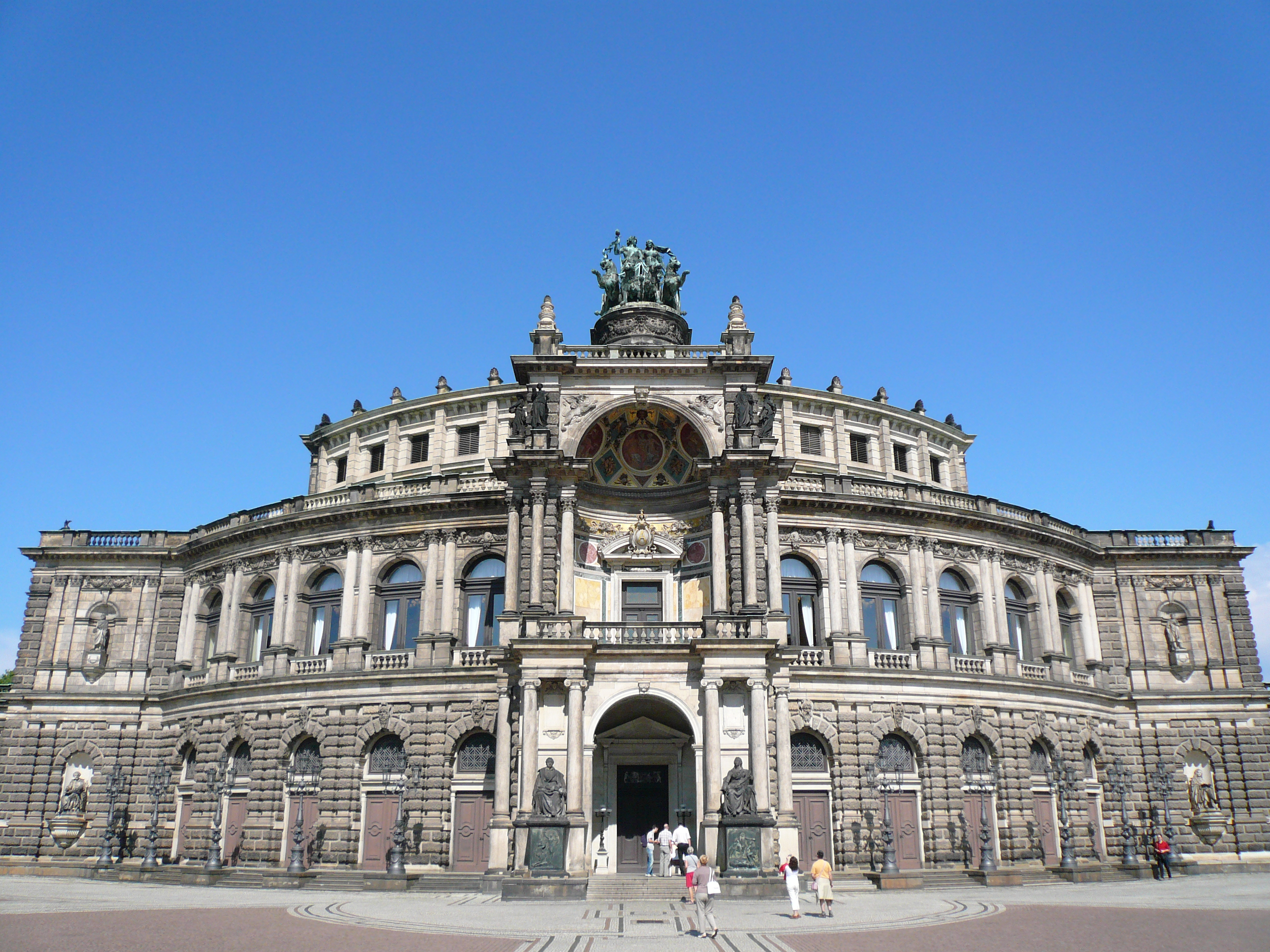
The Semperoper in Dresden

Historicism, sometimes known as eclecticism, is an architectural style that draws inspiration from historic styles or craftsmanship. After the neoclassical period (which could itself be considered a historicist movement), a new historicist phase emerged in the middle of the 19th century, marked by a return to a more ancient classicism, in particular in architecture and in the genre of history painting.

An important architect of this period was Gottfried Semper, who built the gallery (1855) at the Zwinger Palace and the Semperoper (1878) in Dresden, and was involved with the first design of the Schwerin Palace. Semper's buildings have features derived from the early Renaissance style, Baroque and even features Corinthian order pillars typical of ancient Greek architecture.

There were regional variants of the historicist styles in Germany. Examples are the resort architecture (especially in MV on the German Baltic coast), the Hanover School of Architecture and the Nuremberg style.

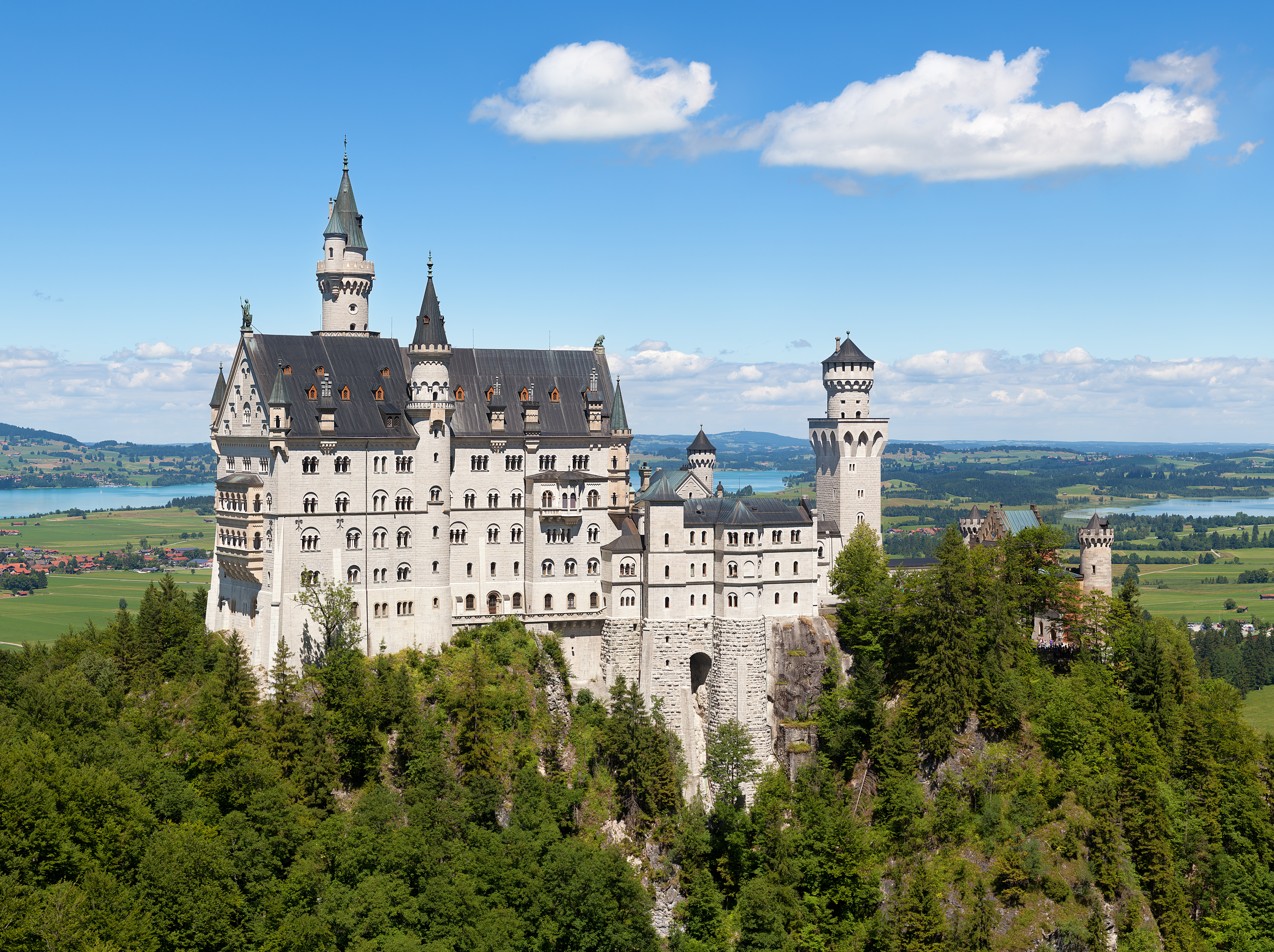
Neuschwanstein Castle

The predilection for medieval buildings has its most famous exemplar in the Neuschwanstein Castle, which Ludwig II commissioned in 1869. Neuschwanstein was designed by Christian Jank, a theatrical set designer, which possibly explains the fantastical nature of the resulting building. The architectural expertise, vital to a building in such a perilous site, was provided first by the Munich court architect Eduard Riedel and later by Georg von Dollmann, son-in-law of Leo von Klenze.

There is also, at the end of the period, the Reichstag building (1894) by Paul Wallot.

== Art Nouveau (Jugendstil) ==
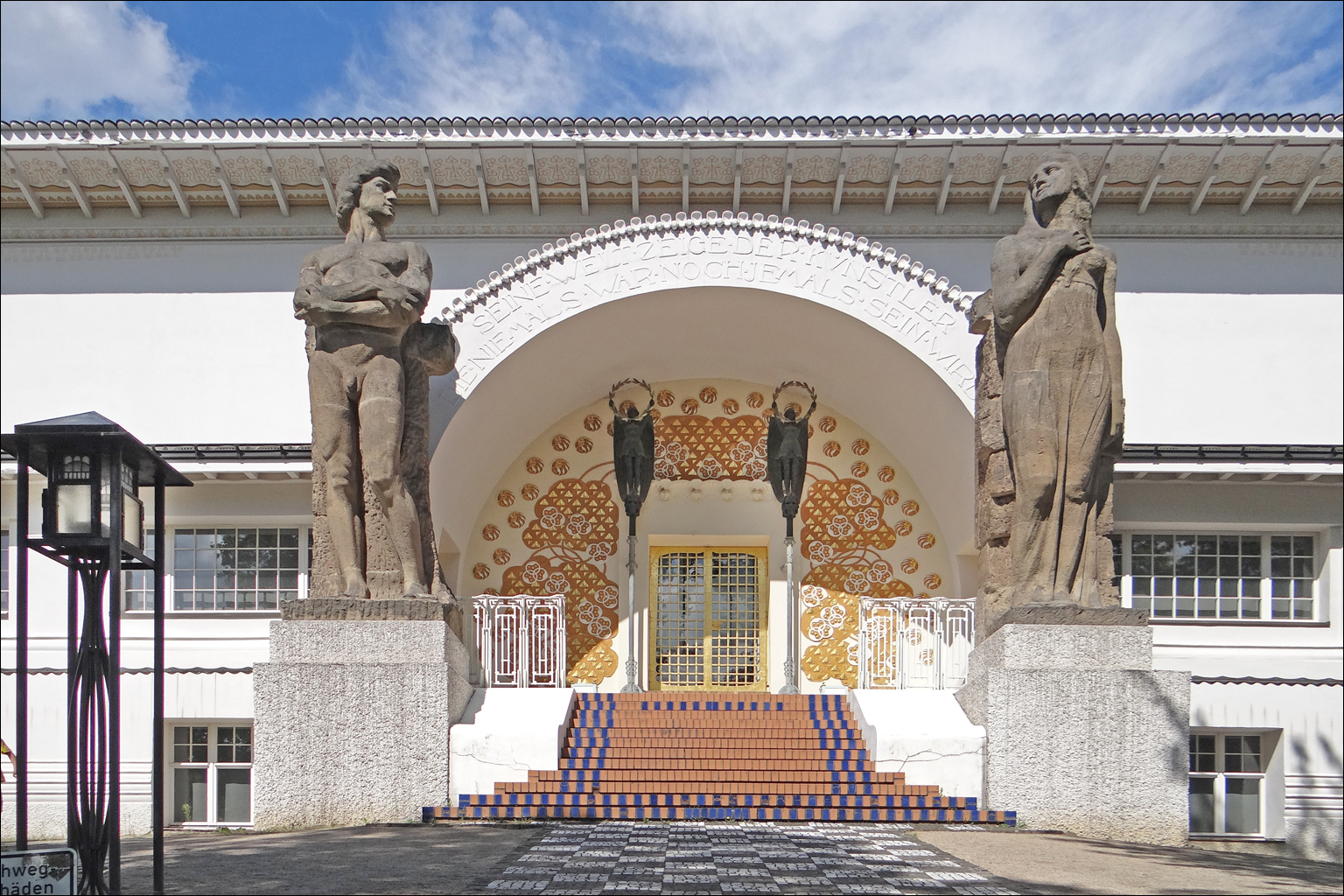
Ernst Ludwig House in Darmstadt Artists' Colony, Darmstadt, Germany, by Joseph Maria Olbrich (1900)

German Art Nouveau is commonly known by its German name, Jugendstil. The name is taken from the artistic journal, Jugend, which was published in Munich and which espoused the new artistic movement. Two other journals, Simplicissimus, published in Munich, and Pan, published in Berlin, proved to be important proponents of the Jugendstil. The two main centres for Jugendstil art in Germany were Munich and Darmstadt.

Drawing from traditional German printmaking, the style uses precise and hard edges, an element that was rather different from the flowing lines seen in Art Nouveau elsewhere. Henry Van de Velde, who worked most of his career in Germany, was a Belgian theorist who influenced many others to continue in this style of graphic art including Peter Behrens, Hermann Obrist, and Richard Riemerschmid. August Endell is another notable Art Nouveau designer.

== Modern ==
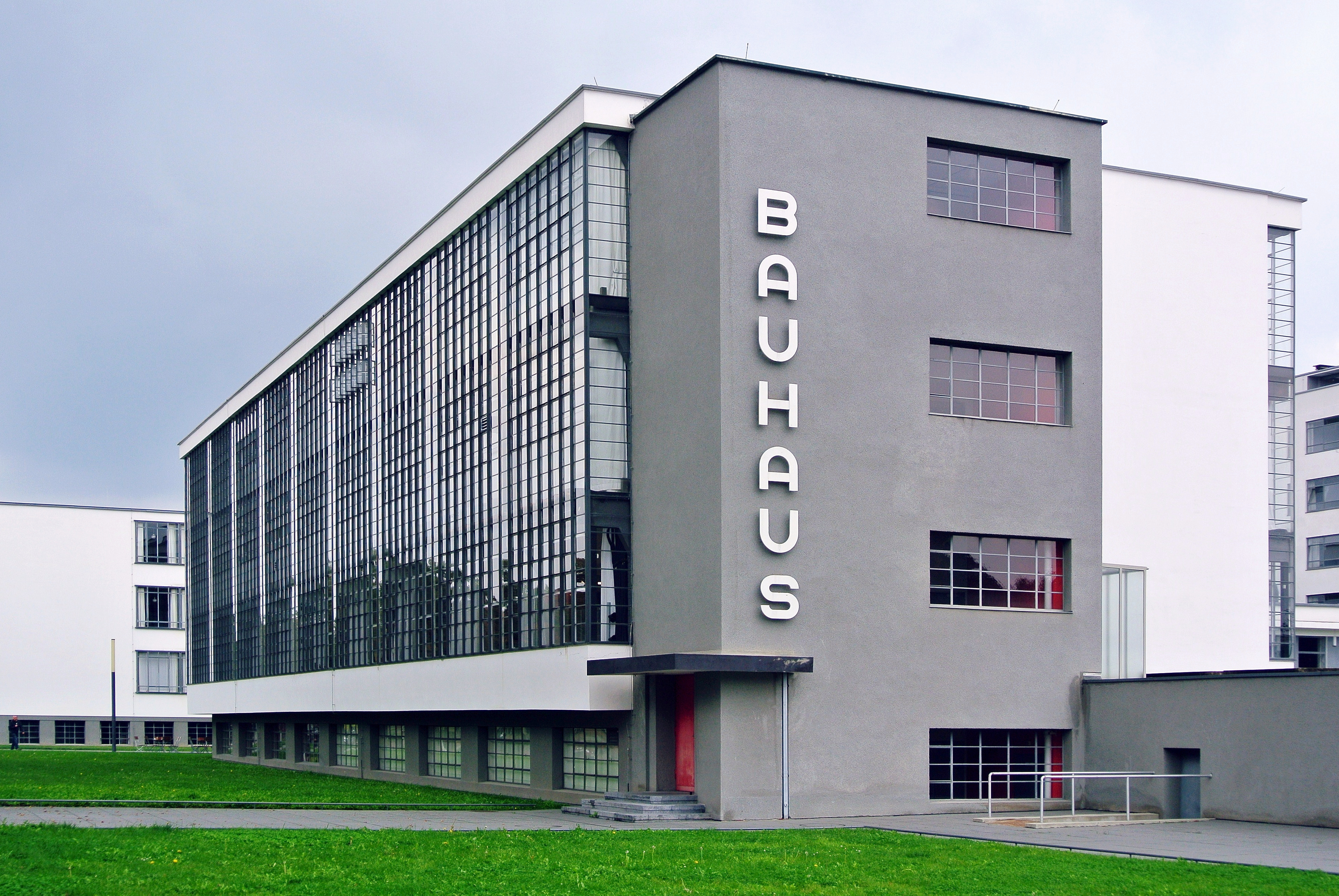
Bauhaus building (Germany). The Bauhaus style co-started modernist architecture.

The distinctive character of modern architecture is the elimination of unnecessary ornament from a building and faithfulness to its structure and function. The style is commonly summed up in four slogans: ornament is a crime, truth to materials, form follows function, and Le Corbusier's description of houses as "machines for living". It developed early in the 20th century. It was adopted by many influential architects and architectural educators. Although few "modern buildings" were built in the first half of the century, after the Second World War it became the dominant architectural style for institutional and corporate buildings for three decades.

The initial impetus for modernist architecture in Germany was mainly industrial construction, in which the architectural design was not subjected so much to the prevailing historicism, for example the AEG Turbine Hall in Berlin by Peter Behrens (1908–1909), and especially the Fagus Factory by Walter Gropius in Alfeld an der Leine (1911–1914). During this period (1915) there occurred the construction of the first skyscraper in Jena.

The so-called "classical modernism" in Germany is essentially identical to the Bauhaus, founded by Walter Gropius in 1919, shortly after he had succeeded Henry van de Velde in Weimar as Director of the Arts and Crafts School. The Bauhaus became the most influential art and architecture school of the 20th century. Although at first it had no architecture department, Gropius saw in architecture the "ultimate goal of all artistic activity."

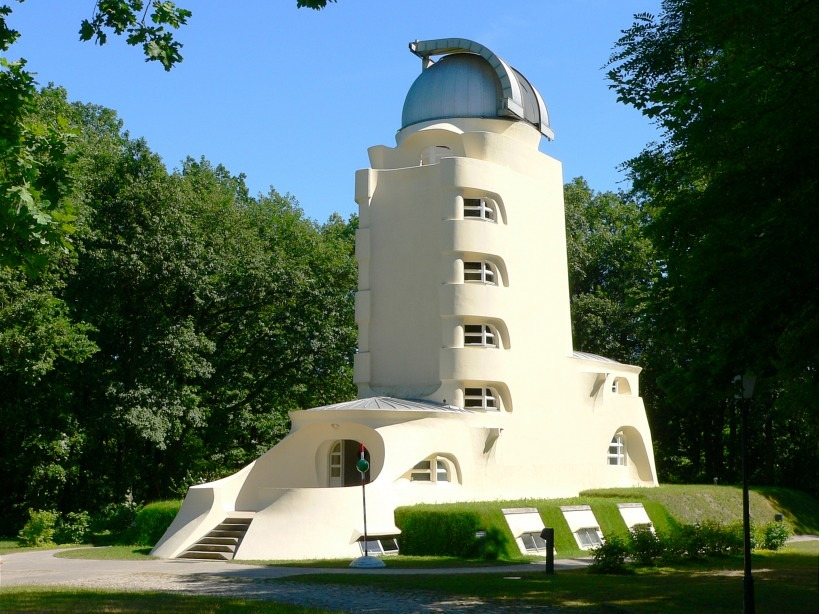
The Einstein Tower in Potsdam

The Einstein Tower (German: Einsteinturm) is an astrophysical observatory in the Albert Einstein Science Park in Potsdam, designed by architect Erich Mendelsohn. This was one of Mendelsohn's first major projects, completed when a young Richard Neutra was on his staff, and his best-known building. At a time of inflation and economic hardship, the Bauhaus sought a cost-effective, functional and modern design for housing. Thus in Weimar in 1923 there arose the Haus am Horn of Georg Muche and Adolf Meyer. In 1925, a year after the nationalist parties gained a majority in the Thuringian state parliament, the Bauhaus in Weimar was shut down. That same year, in Dessau, Gropius began to build a new school, completed in 1926. The Bauhaus Dessau is by far the most famous monument of classical modern art in Germany.

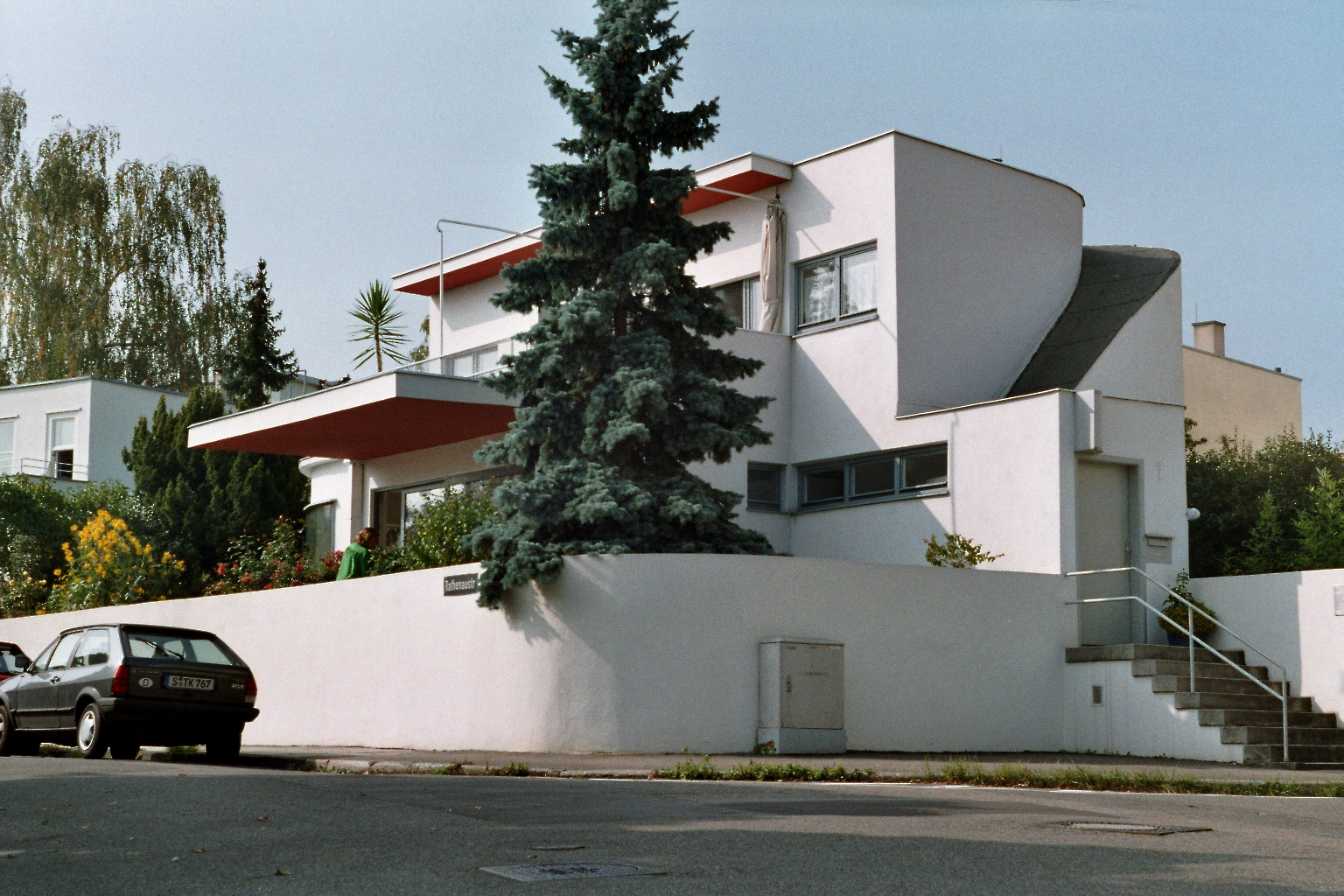
The Scharoun residence, Weissenhof Estate, Stuttgart

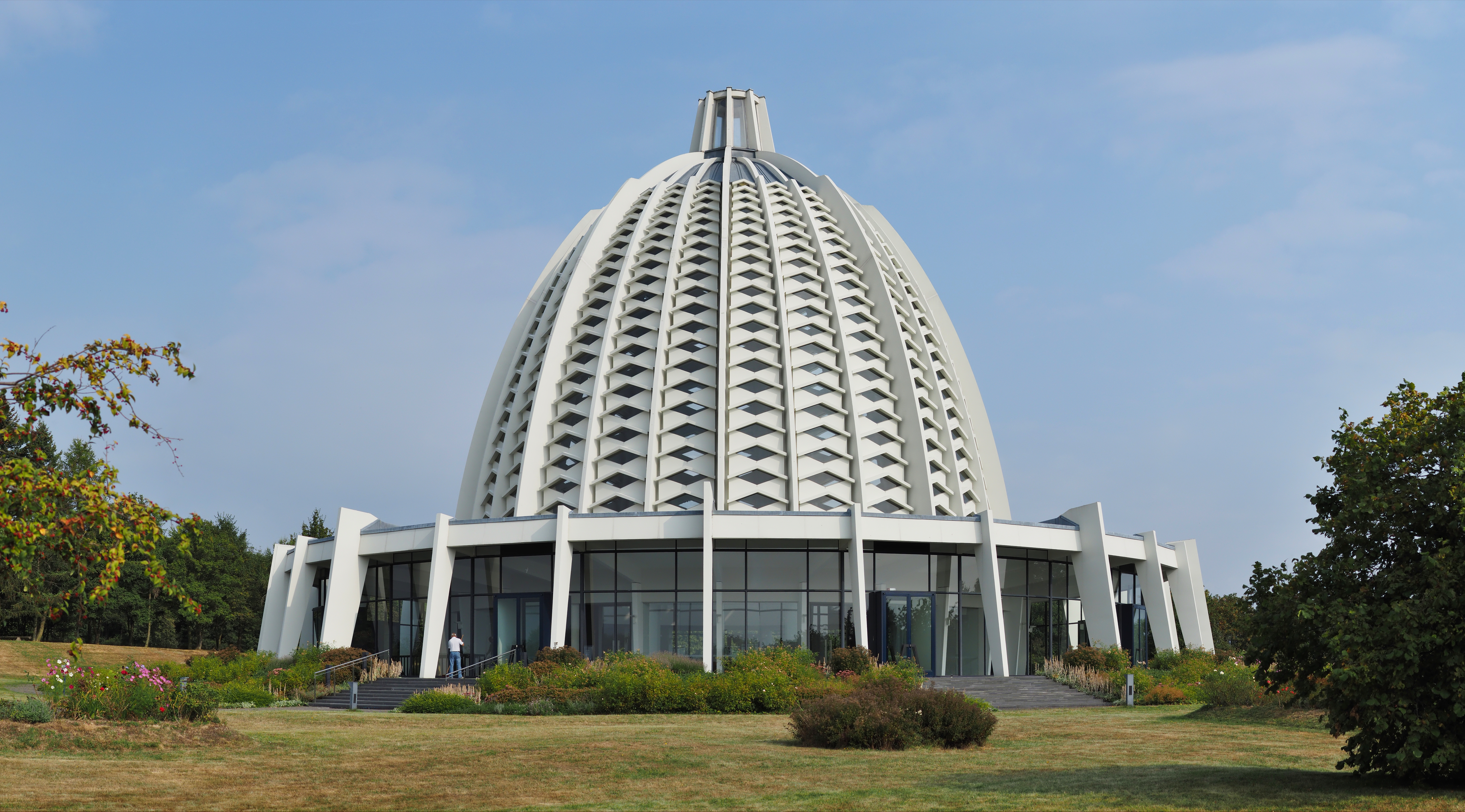
Baháʼí House of Worship in Langenhain near Frankfurt

When the Nazis gained power in 1932, the Bauhaus shut down. After this there was a diaspora of masters and students of the Bauhaus across the world, especially in the United States, and the Bauhaus style spread through the world, becoming known as the International Style. In 1927, one of the first and most defining manifestations of the International Style was the Weissenhof Estate in Stuttgart, built as a component of the exhibition "Die Wohnung," organized by the Deutscher Werkbund, and overseen by Mies van der Rohe. The fifteen contributing architects included Mies, and other names most associated with the movement: Peter Behrens, Le Corbusier, Walter Gropius, J.J.P. Oud, Mart Stam, and Bruno Taut. The exhibition was enormously popular, with thousands of daily visitors.

A number of housing estates built in this period are now among the most important buildings of the modernist period. They include the Horseshoe housing estate built in Berlin in 1930 by Bruno Taut and Martin Wagner during the Weimar Republic, The Allotment Dammerstock (1930) in Karlsruhe by Gropius, and the Zeche Zollverein in Essen, built from 1927 to 1932 by Fritz Schupp and Martin Kremmer.

Between 1926 and 1940 most radio towers in Germany were built of wood, of which the tallest was that of Transmitter Muehlacker (190 metres). The only remaining of them is Gliwice Radio Tower in Gliwice (nowadays Poland).

== National Socialism ==
The Nazi architecture (1933–1945) with main architect Albert Speer served propaganda purposes.

== Post-war reconstruction ==
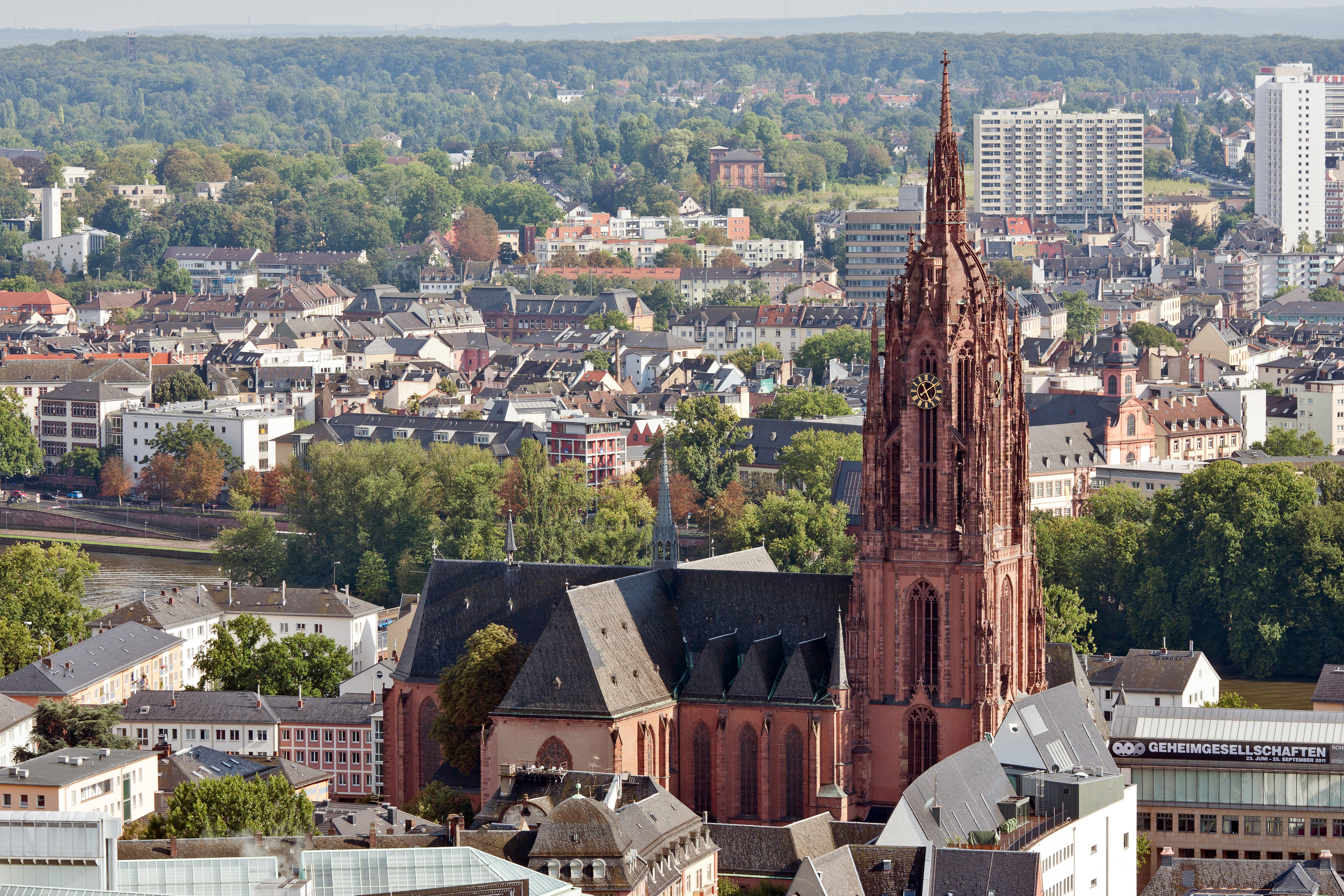
Postwar reconstruction: the historic Frankfurt Cathedral has been rebuilt.

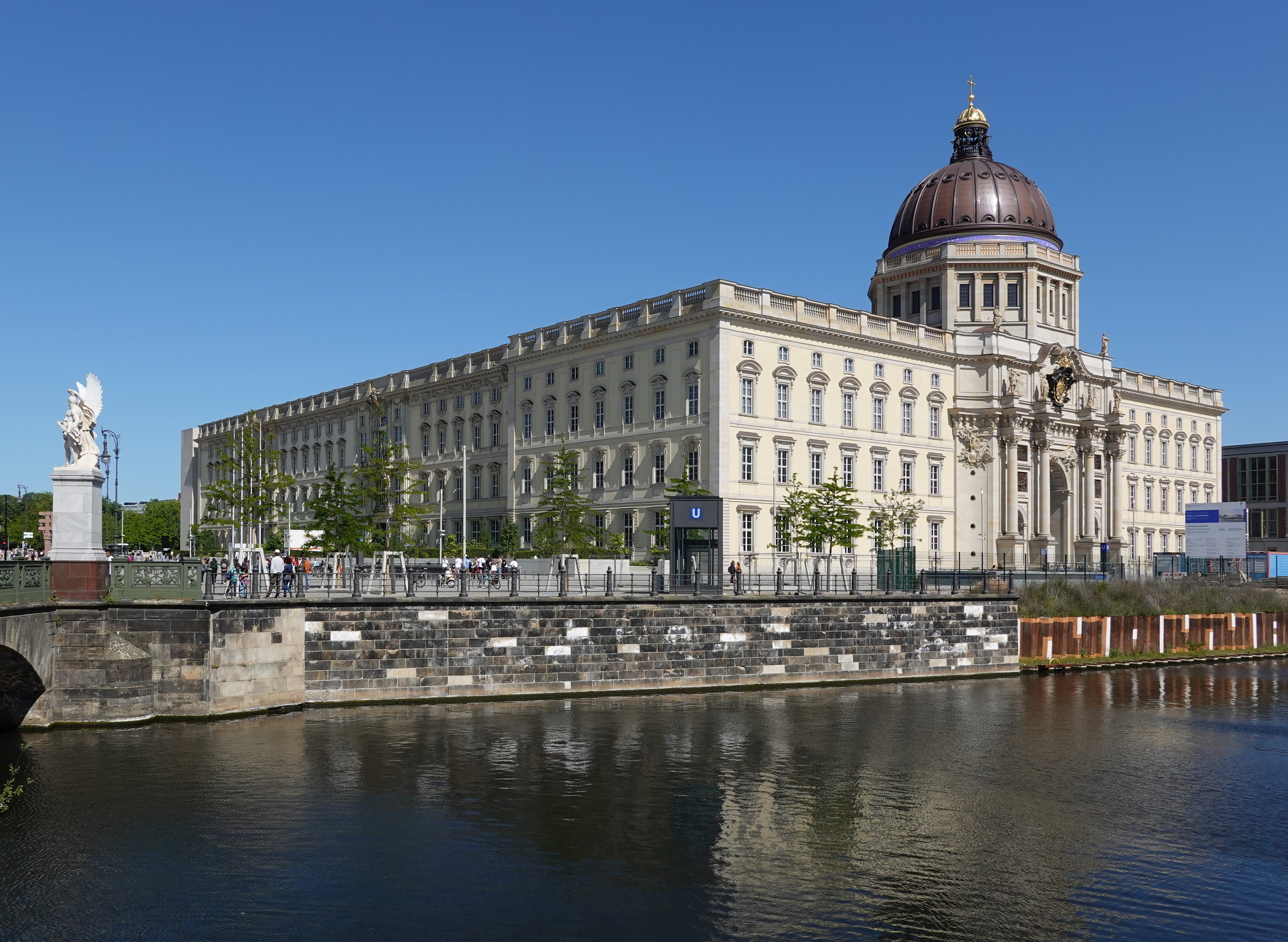
Berlin City Palace

During the Allied strategic bombing campaign of World War II, the historic city centres of most cities suffered severe losses to architectural heritage, with significant cases of almost total annihilation.

The fiercely discussed reconstruction efforts after the war varied considerably between East and West Germany, and between individual cities. In most cities some of the more significant landmarks were restored or reconstructed, often in a simplified manner. In general, the cities were not reconstructed according to their historic appearance, but in a functional, modernist style, with often a greater emphasis on desperately needed housing, than historic structures.

There is a recent trend that began in the late 20th century and continues to the 21st century in many German cities to resume reconstruction work and New Classical architecture in core areas. Examples of this can be found at the Neumarkt in Dresden (including the famous Frauenkirche), with reconstructions in the old town of Frankfurt (Dom-Römer Project), with the City Palace of Berlin, the Historic Market Place in Hildesheim and the old market and City Palace of Potsdam.

== See also ==
- German Architecture Museum
- German-Chilean architecture
- Association of German Architects
- List of German architects
- List of architecture schools in Germany
- Architecture of Berlin
- Architecture of Munich
