= List of architecture schools in Germany =

This is a list of architecture schools in Germany.

== Academy of arts (Kunsthochschulen) ==
- Alanus University of Arts and Social Sciences (Alanus Hochschule für Kunst und Gesellschaft in Alter), Faculty of Architecture, Bonn
- Staatliche Akademie der Bildenden Künste Stuttgart, Faculty of Architecture, Stuttgart
- Academy of Fine Arts Nuremberg
- Kunstakademie Düsseldorf
- Academy of Fine Arts – Städelschule, Frankfurt am Main (postgraduate MA)

== Universities of Technology (Technische Universitäten) ==
- RWTH Aachen (Rheinisch-Westfaelische Technische Hochschule), Faculty of Architecture, Aachen
- Technische Universität Berlin (TUB), Faculty VI Planning – Building – Environment, Berlin
- Braunschweig University of Technology, (Technische Universität Braunschweig)
- Brandenburg University of Technology (Brandenburgische Technische Universität), Cottbus, Faculty of Architecture, Civil Engineering and Urban Planning
- Technische Universität Darmstadt (TUD), Faculty XV, Faculty of Architecture, Darmstadt
- Dresden University of Technology (Technische Universität Dresden)
- Karlsruhe Institute of Technology, Faculty of Architecture, Karlsruhe
- Technical University of Munich (TUM), Department of Architecture, Munich

== Universities (Universitäten) ==
- Berlin University of the Arts (UdK), College of Architecture, Media and Design, Studiengang Architektur, Berlin,
- Bauhaus University Weimar (BUW), Faculty of Architecture
- Universität Dortmund
- HafenCity University
- Leibniz University Hannover (LUH), Faculty of Architecture and Landscape Sciences, Hanover
- University of Kassel, Faculty of Architecture and Urban planning, Kassel
- Universität Siegen
- University of Stuttgart, Faculty of Architecture and Urban Planning, Stuttgart
- Bergische Universität Wuppertal

== Universities of Applied Sciences (Hochschulen) ==
- Anhalt University of Applied Sciences, Dessau Institute of Architecture, Bauhaus Dessau, (Masters School / M.Arch / language: English)
- Fachhochschule Aachen
- Augsburg University of Applied Sciences (Fachhochschule Augsburg)
- Berlin International University of Applied Sciences
- Beuth University of Applied Sciences Berlin
- University of Applied Sciences Biberach
- University of Applied Sciences Bremen, Department of Architecture, Bremen
- Hochschule 21 in Buxtehude (HS21), Buxtehude
- Hochschule Bochum
- Fachhochschule Coburg
- Fachhochschule Lausitz in Cottbus
- Fachhochschule Lippe und Höxter in Detmold Detmold
- Fachhochschule Dortmund
- Fachhochschule Düsseldorf
- Darmstadt University of Applied Sciences (Hochschule Darmstadt) (h_da), Faculty of Architecture, Darmstadt
- Hochschule Anhalt in Dessau
- Hochschule für Technik und Wirtschaft Dresden
- Fachhochschule Erfurt
- University of Applied Sciences Frankfurt am Main, (Fachhochschule Frankfurt am Main), Frankfurt am Main
- Staatliche Hochschule für Bildende Künste – Städelschule (postgraduate MA)
- Fachhochschule Gießen-Friedberg
- Fachhochschule Heidelberg
- Fachhochschule Hildesheim/Holzminden/Göttingen in Hildesheim
- Fachhochschule Hildesheim/Holzminden/Göttingen in Holzminden
- Fachhochschule Kaiserslautern
- Fachhochschule Koblenz
- Technical University of Cologne
- Karlsruhe University of Applied Sciences, (Hochschule Karlsruhe)
- Hochschule Konstanz
- Fachhochschule Lübeck
- Hochschule für Technik, Wirtschaft und Kultur Leipzig
- Fachhochschule Mainz
- Fachhochschule Münster (Münster School of Architecture)
- Fachhochschule Bielefeld in Minden
- Munich University of Applied Sciences, Faculty of Architecture
- Technische Hochschule Nürnberg
- Akademie der Bildenden Künste Nürnberg
- Fachhochschule Oldenburg/Ostfriesland/Wilhelmshaven in Oldenburg
- Fachhochschule Potsdam
- Hochschule Wismar
- Hochschule Zittau/Görlitz in Zittau
