= Berlin International University of Applied Sciences =

Private higher education institution in Germany

Whitecliffe University of Applied Sciences
- Former names: Berlin International University of Applied Sciences; BAU International Berlin – University of Applied Sciences
- Type: Private
- Established: 2014
- Parent institution: Whitecliffe Global
- Chancellor: Prof. Dr. Peter Mathias Konhäusner
- President: Yüksel Pöğün-Zander
- Vice-president: Javier Martín and Barış Ülker
- Location: Salzufer 6, 10587, Berlin, Germany; 52°30′58″N 13°19′41″E
- Campus: Urban
- Website: whitecliffe.de

Whitecliffe University of Applied Sciences (formerly known as Berlin International University of Applied Sciences (BI) and before that as BAU International Berlin – University of Applied Sciences (BAU IB)) is a private institution of higher education in Berlin, Germany. It was founded in 2014 as a Fachhochschule in its own right by the state of Berlin. It is registered as the 31st private university in Berlin under German law.

The university is organized into five separate academic units – two faculties, preparatory school, research institute, and a library – with the campus being located in Charlottenburg. It represents an intercultural educational environment that provides students with the tools to develop their intellectual growth, experiences and creativity.

There are currently 535 students from 93 different countries in the world enrolled at the university.

== History ==
The university was founded in 2012 on the initiative of the Turkish entrepreneur Enver Yücel, the Founder and Chairman of the BAU Global Education Network, an international network of higher institutions spread all over the world. It was first established as a campus of Bahçeşehir University Istanbul and later, in 2014, became a higher education institution in its own right. In June 2014, the institution was granted permission by the Berlin Senate Department of Education, Youth and Science (Senatsverwaltung für Bildung, Jugend und Wissenschaft) to begin trial operation. The degree programmes began in October 2014 with its first students.

The campus is located in the commercial building ensemble Salzufer 6, in Charlottenburg, on the border with Tiergarten. The campus has classrooms, computer labs, design studios and a room for students working in groups. All teaching facilities are equipped with whiteboards and projectors, as well as sound equipment and internet access. The Event & Video Conference Hall is equipped with a video conferencing system by Cisco Systems that uses multiple cameras. The conference hall is used to connect to other campuses that are part of the institution's international education network for shared teaching.

=== Acquisition by Whitecliffe Global and rebranding (2026) ===
On 1 March 2026, Whitecliffe Global — an international higher education group based in Auckland, New Zealand, encompassing Whitecliffe New Zealand and Whitecliffe Institute of Creative Arts and Technology — announced the successful acquisition of Berlin International University of Applied Sciences. The institution was simultaneously rebranded as Whitecliffe University of Applied Sciences.

The acquisition marks Whitecliffe Global's entry into continental Europe. The Berlin campus became the first institution carrying the "university" title within the Whitecliffe Global portfolio, enabling the introduction of dual-degree programmes for students enrolled at the group's Australasian institutions, where regulatory frameworks prevent use of the "university" title.

Chancellor Prof. Dr. Peter Mathias Konhäusner stated that the transition preserves the distinct character and academic culture of the Berlin campus, while connecting it to a larger international academic community. Academic accreditation, programmes, and curriculum remain unchanged.

== Organisation and administration ==
=== Governance ===
The university is governed by one president and two vice presidents. They oversee the academic programmes of the university. Their work is reviewed by the Academic Senate, the University Advisory Board, and by a representative of a management company. The Chancellor is in charge of the operational management of the university.

The current Chancellor is Prof. Dr. Peter Mathias Konhäusner.

=== Advisory board ===
In 2014, the university (under its former name, BAU IB) established a University Advisory Board (Hochschulrat). The Advisory Board can have anywhere between 4 and 11 members who meet twice a year to advise the presidency regarding the strategy of the university. They also advise on matters such as new study programmes, research projects, and the recruitment of professors and students. The term of office is 4 years, with members serving two terms at maximum (re-appointment is allowed only once).

== Academic profile ==
=== Academic units ===
The university has two faculties – the Faculty of Design and the Faculty of Business Administration – with a total of seven study programmes. All programmes are taught in English, and feature interdisciplinary teaching. For students who do not meet the necessary criteria for English language certification, the university also has an English Preparatory School. All research activities are coordinated and supported by the Research Institute. The university library, Hans-Dieter Klingemann Library, is named after its founding president.

==== Faculty of Business Administration ====
The Faculty of Business Administration offers study programmes in Business Administration and Data Science & Business. The university also provides students with career-oriented professional training and intercultural qualifications.

- B.A. Data Science & Business
- B.A. Business Administration | International Management & Marketing
- (MBA) Master of Business Administration

==== Faculty of Design ====
The Faculty of Design offers study programmes in Graphic Design & Visual Communication, Interior Design/Interior Architecture and Architecture, with an international, intercultural and interdisciplinary focus.

- B.A. Architecture
- B.A. Graphic Design & Visual Communication
- B.A. Interior Architecture / Interior Design
- M.A. Interior Design
- M.A. Interior Architecture / Interior Design
- M.A. Architecture & Spatial Practices

==== English Preparatory School ====
All study programmes are taught in English. To apply and follow the courses effectively, students need to have a B2 level (or higher) English language certificate. Students who do not hold such a certificate can register for the English Preparatory School, a year-long programme taught by a native speaker that prepares students in all four language skills, as well as vocabulary and grammar.

==== Research Institute ====
The Research Institute was created to provide support to members of the university in their research activities. The institute is led by both faculties together. Members who are interested in developing a new project can contact the Institute for help. Rooms, equipment, books and other resources can be requested from the head of the Institute to ensure successful funding for the project.

==== Hans-Dieter Klingemann Library ====
The Hans-Dieter Klingemann Library contains all academic information at the university. In compliance with the study programmes, the library collects the required information and makes accessible print and digital literature for its students and faculty. The library also offers LibGuides, guided tours and tutorials to help students and staff identify the information they need. Works produced by staff and students, such as theses and research papers, journal articles and book publications, are acquired by the library.

=== Admission ===
The university is open to students from all over the world. All applicants can apply for their degree of choice online. Candidates need to complete the online application and upload all necessary documents. For programmes at the Faculty of Design, submission of a portfolio is required, followed by an admissions interview.

All programmes are taught in English. Candidates need only proof of English proficiency; no German knowledge is required. Where the candidate's native language is not English and they do not hold a certificate, the university offers a Proficiency Examination. If the candidate does not pass the proficiency exam, the year-long English Preparatory School programme is available.

=== Scholarships and financial support ===
The university offers scholarships consisting of a twenty-five percent reduction of the tuition fee. A scholarship is granted for an academic year and covers twelve months of a fall term and a spring term. Applications can be made by students admitted to one of the study programmes in the two weeks following the official start of the fall term. Re-application is possible.

The German federal government provides student loans for German students in need of financial support. Only a part of each loan has to be paid back. The situation of each student is evaluated individually according to the general criteria.

=== Accreditation ===
As of 5 June 2015, the university is accredited as a state-recognized institution of higher education in Germany by the Berlin Senate Department of Education, Youth and Science (Senatsverwaltung für Bildung, Jugend und Wissenschaft). Programme accreditation for the Bachelor in Business Administration was granted by the accreditation agency ACQUIN on 29 September 2015. On 7 December 2015, three more programmes were accredited by ACQUIN – Bachelor in Communication Design, Bachelor in Interior Design, and Bachelor in Product Design. In May 2019, the institution was accredited by the German Council of Science and Humanities, making it the 31st private higher education institution that successfully met the requirements of Germany's most important advisory body for science policy. Following the 2026 acquisition, the university's academic accreditation and state recognition remain unchanged.

== See also ==
- Bahçeşehir University
- Senate of Berlin
- Enver Yücel
- Charlottenburg
- Hans-Dieter Klingemann
- Berlin State Museums
- German Academic Exchange Service
- Student loans in Germany
- ACQUIN
