= List of basilicas in Germany =

This is an incomplete list of basilicas of the Roman Catholic Church in Germany. A basilica is a church with certain privileges conferred on it by the Pope. Currently there are some 76 basilicas in Germany.

== List of basilicas ==
Location	Circumscription	Basilica	Date of Designation	Image
Bad Staffelstein, Bavaria	Bamberg	Basilica of Our Lady of Assumption	September 2, 1897	
Neukölln, Berlin	Military Ordinariate of Germany	Basilica of St. John the Baptist Patron of Breslavia	December 3, 1906	
Altötting, Bavaria	Passau	Basilica of St. Ann	July 8, 1913	
Ettal, Bavaria	Munich and Freising	Ettal Abbey	January 28, 1920	
Trier, Rhineland-Palatinate	Trier	St. Matthias' Abbey	March 20, 1920	
Cologne, North Rhine-Westphalia	Cologne	St. Gereon's Basilica	June 25, 1920	
Cologne, North Rhine-Westphalia	Cologne	Basilica of St. Ursula	June 25, 1920	
Kevelaer, North Rhine-Westphalia	Münster	Basilica of St Mary Comforter of Sorrows	April 11, 1923	
Worms, Rhineland-Palatinate	Mainz	Worms Cathedral	November 12, 1923	
Bamberg, Bavaria	Bamberg	Imperial Cathedral of Sts. Peter and Paul and St. George	December 4, 1923	
Speyer, Rhineland-Palatinate	Speyer	Speyer Cathedral	May 13, 1925	
Seligenstadt, Hesse	Mainz	Basilica of Sts. Marcellinus and Petrus	May 27, 1925	
Ottobeuren, Bavaria	Augsburg	Ottobeuren Abbey	November 25, 1925	
Maria Laach, Rhineland-Palatinate	Trier	Maria Laach Abbey	July 14, 1926	
Streithausen, Rhineland-Palatinate	Limburg	Basilica of Our Lady of the Assumption	June 22, 1927	
Berlin	Berlin	St. Hedwig's Cathedral	October 27, 1927	
Niddatal, Hesse	Mainz	Basilica of the Immaculate Conception, Sts. Peter and Paul	November 28, 1928	
Bingen am Rhein, Rhineland-Palatinate	Mainz	Basilica of St. Martin	March 12, 1930	
Niederalteich, Bavaria	Passau	Basilica of St. Mauritius	November 11, 1931	
Xanten, North Rhine-Westphalia	Münster	Xanten Cathedral	May 13, 1936	
Tuntenhausen, Bavaria	Munich and Freising	Basilica of the Assumption of Our Lady	June 23, 1942	
Gößweinstein, Bavaria	Bamberg	Basilica of the Holy Trinity	May 7, 1948	
Prüm, Rhineland-Palatinate	Trier	Basilica of the Transfiguration of Our Lord	June 10, 1950	
Berlin-Steglitz	Berlin	Basilica of Our Lady Queen of Rosary	October 20, 1950	
Trier, Rhineland-Palatinate	Trier	Basilica of Our Lady of the Assumption (German: Liebfrauenkirche	July 13, 1951	
Cologne, North Rhine-Westphalia	Cologne	Basilica of St. Severin	March 9, 1953	
Werl, North Rhine-Westphalia	Paderborn	Basilica of the Visitation of Our Lady	October 16, 1953	
Konstanz, Baden-Württemberg	Freiburg	Cathedral of Constance	May 30, 1955	
Bonn, North Rhine-Westphalia	Cologne	Bonn Minster	January 14, 1956	
Weingarten, Baden-Württemberg	Rottenburg-Stuttgart	Weingarten Abbey	March 16, 1956	
Aschaffenburg, Bavaria	Würzburg	Basilica of Sts. Peter and Alexander	January 17, 1958	
Trier, Rhineland-Palatinate	Trier	St. Paulinus' Church	May 23, 1958	
Sankt Wendel, Saarland	Trier	Basilica of St. Wendal	April 22, 1960	
Kall, North Rhine-Westphalia	Aachen	Steinfeld Abbey	October 7, 1960	
Walldürn, Baden-Württemberg	Freiburg	Basilica of St. George and of the Most Precious Blood	February 16, 1962	
Hildesheim, Lower Saxony	Hildesheim	Basilica of St. Godehard	December 7, 1963	
Ellwangen, Baden-Württemberg	Rottenburg-Stuttgart	Basilica of St. Vitus	January 18, 1964	
Regensburg, Bavaria	Regensburg	St. Emmeram's Abbey	February 18, 1964	
Regensburg, Bavaria	Regensburg	Basilica of the Nativity of Our Lady to the Ancient Chapel	March 5, 1964	
Ingolstadt, Bavaria	Eichstätt	Basilica of the Assumption of Our Lady	June 1, 1964	
Cologne, North Rhine-Westphalia	Cologne	St. Maria im Kapitol	April 23, 1965	
Cologne, North Rhine-Westphalia	Cologne	Basilica of the Holy Apostles	September 18, 1965	
Altenstadt, Bavaria	Augsburg	Basilica of St. Michael	October 9, 1965	
Düsseldorf-Kaiserswerth, North Rhine-Westphalia	Cologne	Basilica of St. Suitbert	March 28, 1967	
Waldsassen, Bavaria	Regensburg	Stiftsbasilika Waldsassen	September 15, 1969	
Kempten, Bavaria	Augsburg	Basilica of St. Lawrence and Our Lady of the Assumption	December 20, 1969	
Uhldingen-Birnau, Baden-Württemberg	Freiburg	Basilica of the Assumption of Our Lady	April 28, 1971	
Benediktbeuern, Bavaria	Augsburg	Benediktbeuern Abbey	May 19, 1972	
Mönchengladbach, North Rhine-Westphalia	Aachen	Gladbach Abbey	April 25, 1973	
Augsburg, Bavaria	Augsburg	St. Ulrich's and St. Afra's Abbey	May 26, 1973	
Dormagen, North Rhine-Westphalia	Cologne	Knechtsteden Abbey	July 25, 1974	
Düsseldorf, North Rhine-Westphalia	Cologne	Basilica of St. Lambert	July 25, 1974	
Saarbrücken, Saarland	Trier	Basilica of St. John the Baptist	October 22, 1975	
Cloppenburg, Lower Saxony	Münster	Basilica of Our Lady of the Seven Sorrows	April 14, 1977	
Scheyern, Bavaria	Munich and Freising	Scheyern Abbey	June 25, 1979	
Dillingen, Bavaria	Augsburg	Basilica of Sts. Peter and Paul	October 11, 1979	
Amberg, Bavaria	Regensburg	Basilica of St. Martin	July 16, 1980	
Düsseldorf-Gerresheim, North Rhine-Westphalia	Cologne	Basilica of St. Margaret	September 14, 1982	
Osterhofen-Altenmarkt, Bavaria	Passau	Basilica of St. Margaret	December 29, 1982	
Straubing, Bavaria	Regensburg	Basilica of St. James	March 9, 1989	
Koblenz, Rhineland-Palatinate	Trier	Basilica of St. Castor	July 30, 1991	
Ulm-Wiblingen, Baden-Württemberg	Rottenburg-Stuttgart	Wiblingen Abbey	May 5, 1993	
Marktleugast-Marienweiher, Bavaria	Bamberg	Basilica of the Visitation of the Blessed Virgin Mary	June 25, 1993	
Essen-Werden, North Rhine-Westphalia	Essen	Werden Abbey	July 12, 1993	
Cologne, North Rhine-Westphalia	Cologne	Basilica of St. Kunibert	January 16, 1998	
Hanover, Lower Saxony	Hildesheim	St Clemens Basilica	March 12, 1998	
Wemding, Bavaria	Eichstätt	Basilica of Our Lady Source for Consolation and the Ascension of Christ	September 12, 1998	
Landshut, Bavaria	Munich and Freising	Basilica of St. Martin and St. Kastulus	December 3, 2001	
Fritzlar, Hesse	Fulda	Basilica of St. Peter	February 14, 2004	
Neuss, North Rhine-Westphalia	Cologne	Minster-Basilica of St. Quirinus of Neuss	October 6, 2009	
Herrieden, Bavaria	Eichstätt	Basilica of Sts. Vitus and Deocar	May 31, 2010	
Kiedrich, Hesse	Limburg	Basilica of Sts. Dionys and Valentine	June 29, 2010	
Lippetal, North Rhine-Westphalia	Münster	Basilica of St. Ida	July 11, 2011	
Wuppertal, North Rhine-Westphalia	Cologne	Basilica of St Laurentius	December 21, 2013	
Boppard, Rheinland-Pfalz	Trier	Basilica of St Severus	February 18, 2014	
Duderstadt, Lower Saxony	Hildesheim	Basilica of St. Cyriakus	October 3, 2015	
Wechselburg, Saxony	Dresden-Meissen	Wechselburg Abbey	September 16, 2018	
Ochsenhausen, Baden-Württemberg	Rottenburg-Stuttgart	Basilica of St. George	June 3, 2019	
Reichenau, Baden-Württemberg	Freiburg	Basilica of the Assumption of the Blessed Virgin Mary and St. Mark the Evangelist, Reichenau Abbey	November 24, 2023	
