= Cave Thomas =

English painter (1820–1906)

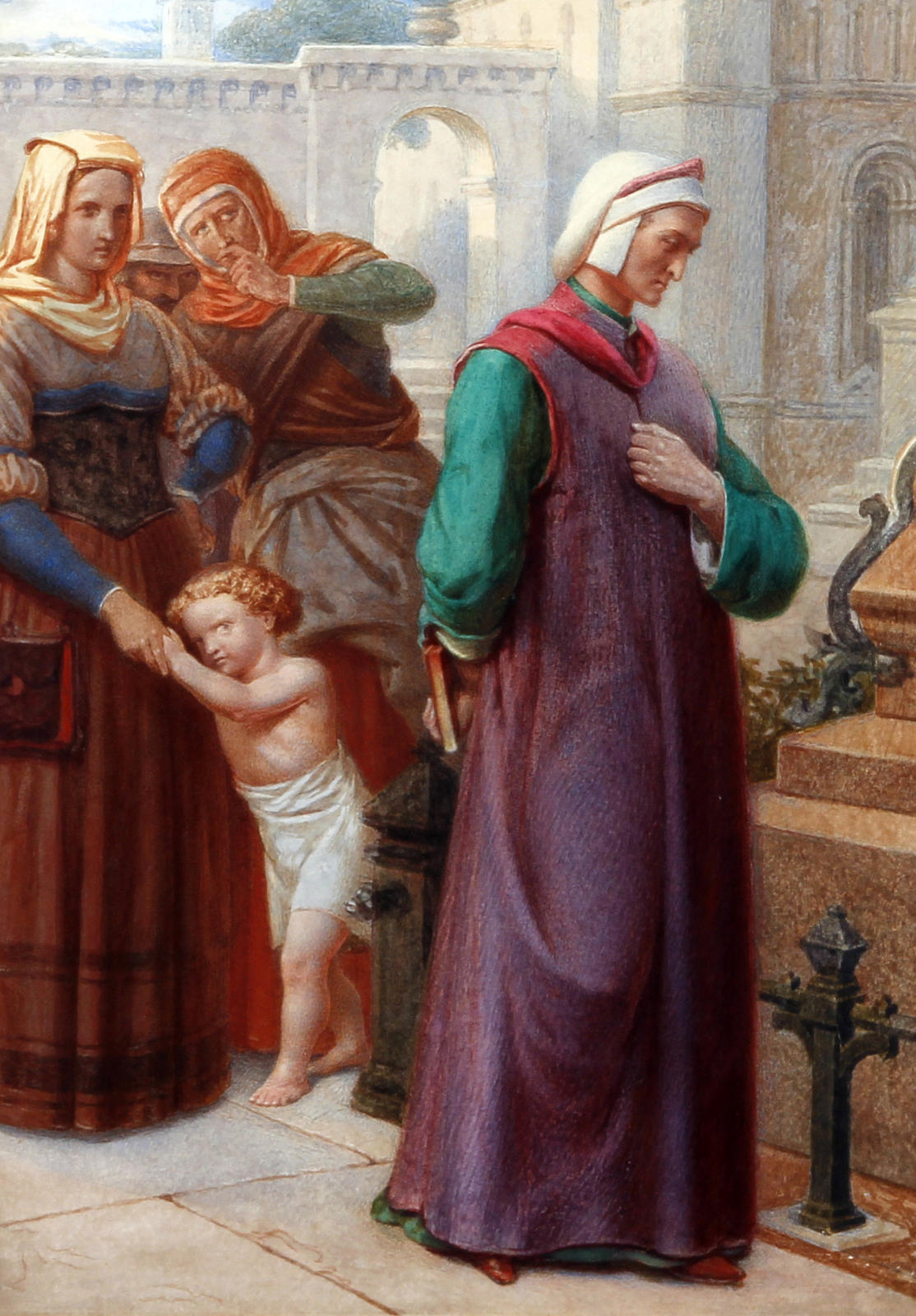
Dante on Earth by Cave Thomas

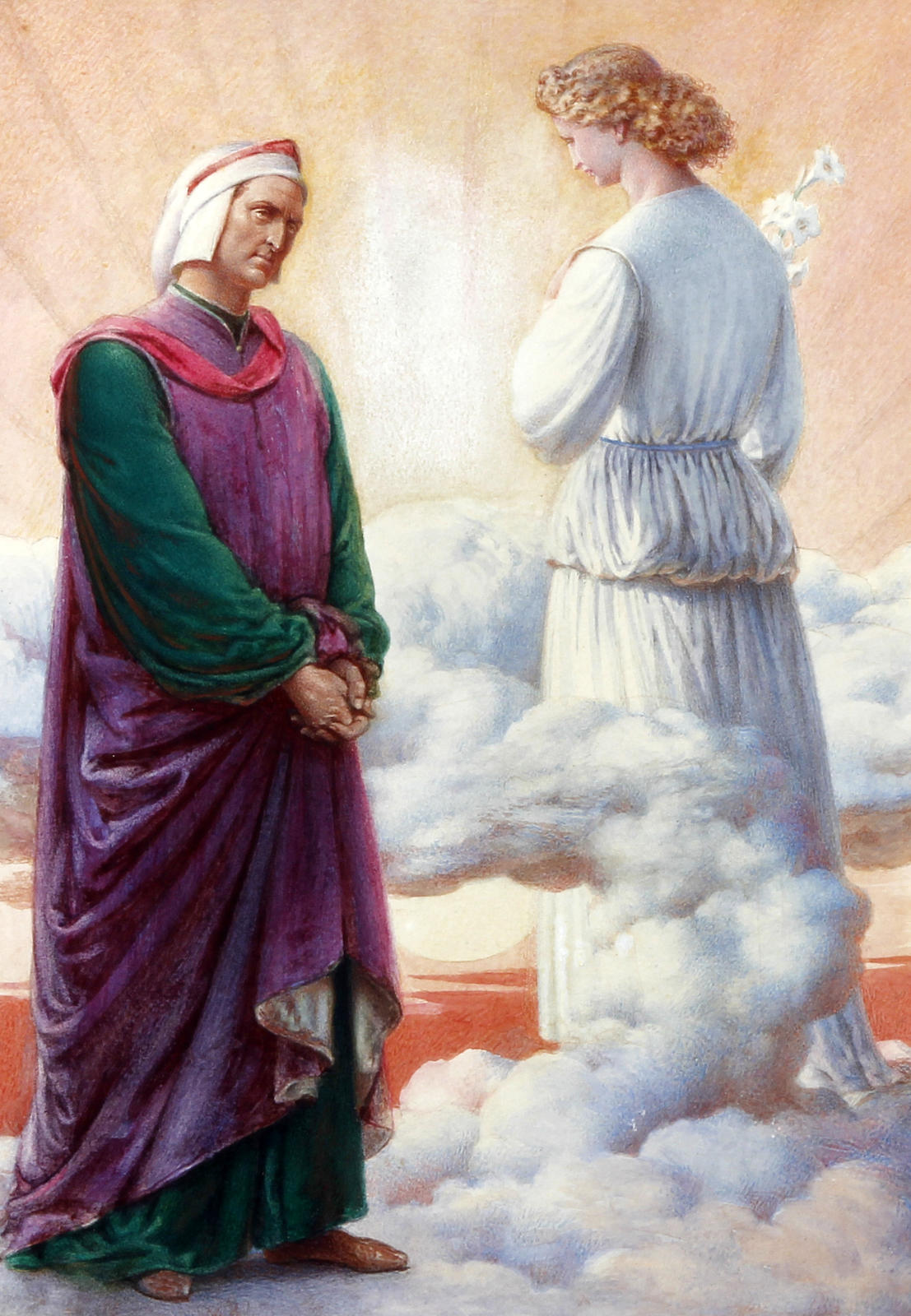
Dante in Heaven

William Cave Thomas (8 May 1820 – 1906), generally referred to as Cave Thomas was an English Victorian painter of historical, religious and literary subjects, also known as a sculptor and author.

== History ==
Thomas was born in London, a son of a picture-frame maker and gilder. He studied at the Royal Academy in the 1830s and in 1840 travelled to Munich, where for several years he attended the Academy of Fine Arts, learning the techniques of fresco painting, working at the basilica of St. Boniface's Abbey and elsewhere under Heinrich Maria von Hess, and was influenced by "Nazarenes" Peter von Cornelius and Johann Friedrich Overbeck.

In 1843 he returned to London, where he had some success as a painter and taught at an art school in Camden Town, and over the years wrote articles for art journals and specialist magazines such as The Builder.

In April 1842 H.M. Government established a competition to select British artists to create artwork on which to base frescoes for the new Houses of Parliament, then under construction. A royal commission was formed with Sir Charles Lock Eastlake (1793–1865), as secretary, and a panel which included the Prince Albert, (Note: In the reference called the Prince Consort, a slight anachronism as the title was not bestowed on him until 1857.) various noblemen and connoisseurs, and such men as the historian Henry Hallam, the poet Samuel Rogers, and the painter William Etty. Over three years, monochrome cartoons 10–15 feet (3.0–4.6 m) in height by some 200 artists were displayed in a series of exhibitions ("Westminster competitions") held at Westminster Hall. From these, six artists were selected:— Charles West Cope, William Dyce, John Callcott Horsley, Daniel Maclise, Richard Redgrave and William Cave Thomas. The subjects Thomas chose for his entries were "St Augustine Preaching to the Britons", "The Bark of the Prosperous", "Justice", and "Philosophy". These last two, for which Thomas was awarded two acquisition prizes totalling £400, were shown at, respectively, Hampton Court Palace and University College, London. Justice was used as modello of Lady Justice in the House of Lords fresco.

Thomas was described as a fringe member of the Pre-Raphaelite Brotherhood, perhaps an understatement as although his output was not large, he was a friend of Dante Gabriel Rossetti and shared a studio with Ford Madox Brown in the 1840s. It has been suggested that it was he who gave the original title, The Germ, for their famous magazine.

== Selected works ==
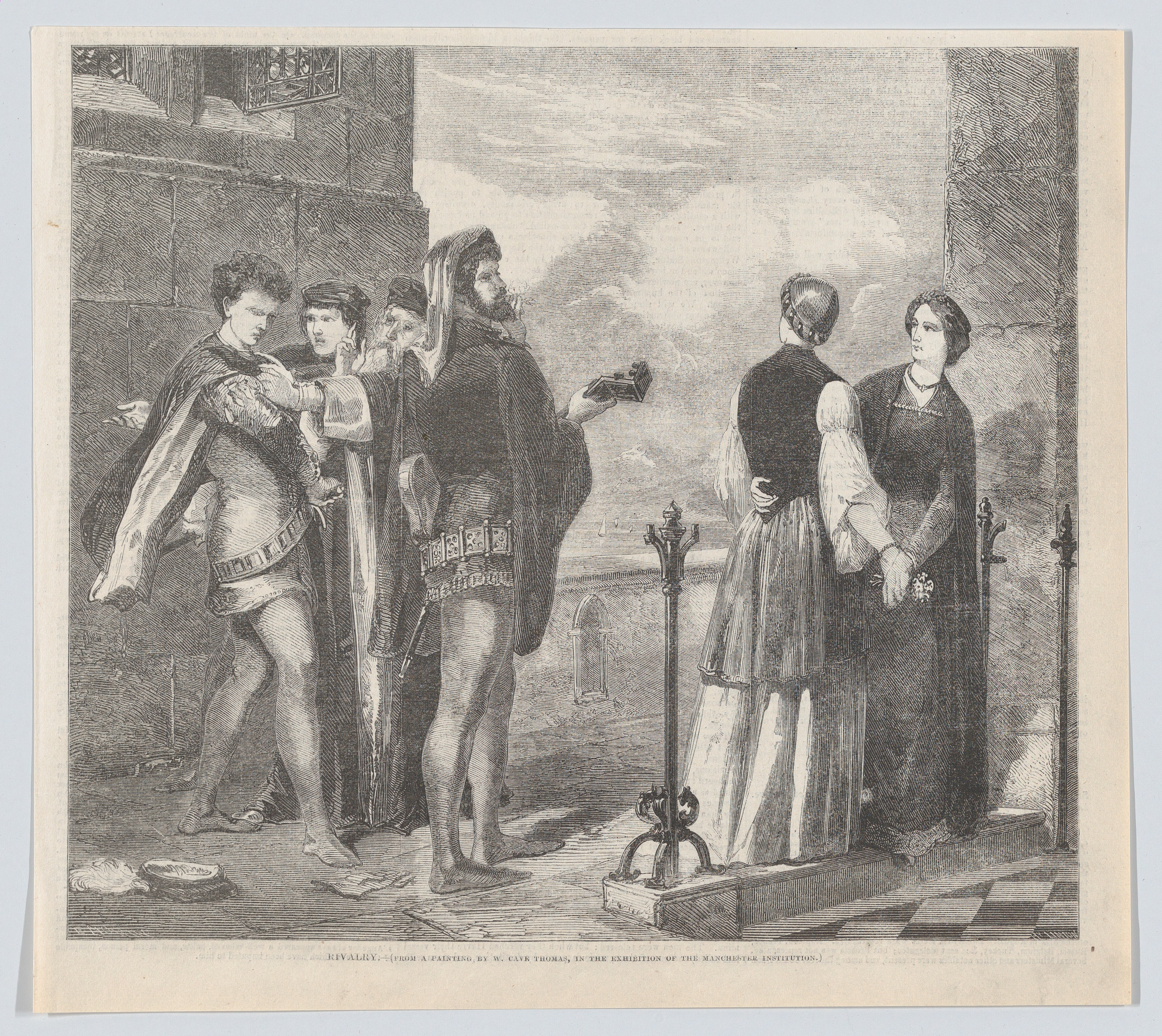
- Rivalry (from the Illustrated Times)
  Rivalry was exhibited at the Royal Academy in 1855 and the Art Treasures Exhibition, Manchester 1857. It found its way to Australia in 1861, where it was later advertised as ". . . without doubt, the finest work of art in the colony". Thomas had a brother, James Henry Thomas, an art patron in Sydney.
- Albrecht Dürer is a large oil on canvas full-length portrait commissioned in 1863 by the builder of the Victoria and Albert Museum for its "Kensington Valhalla" court at South Kensington. Various artists were so commissioned, to be copied as mosaics representing great artists, and in the end Thomas's was not used.
