= Bonn Minster =

Catholic church in Bonn, Germany

Minster of St. Martin's
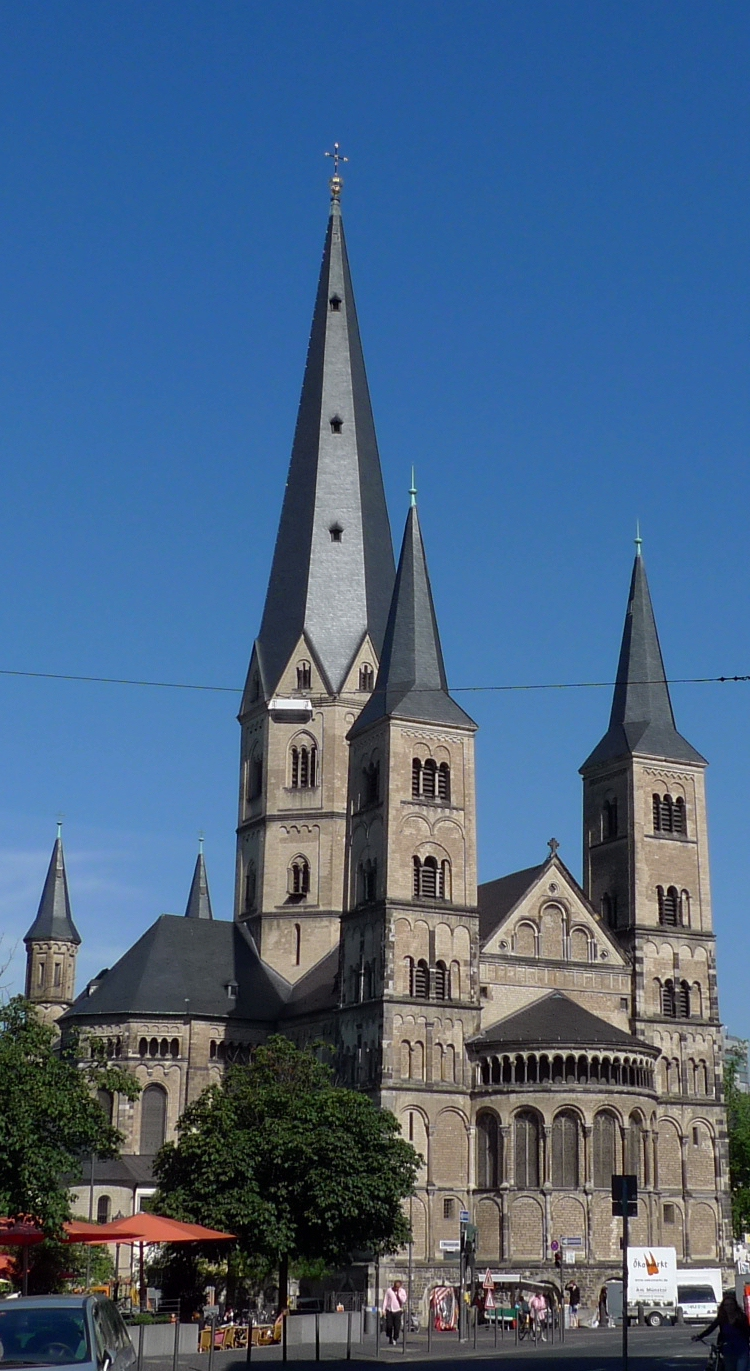
- Bonn Minster

Religion
- Affiliation: Catholic
- Ecclesiastical or organizational status: Papal basilica minor

Location
- Location: Bonn, Germany
- Interactive map of Minster of St. Martin's
- Coordinates: 50°44′00″N 7°05′59″E

Architecture
- Type: minster
- Style: Romanesque architecture

Specifications
- Direction of façade: East, Slightly Southeast
- Height (max): 81.4 meters
- Dome: None
- Spire: Five

Website
- www.bonner-muenster.de

Bonn Minster (German: Bonner Münster) is a Catholic church in Bonn. It is one of Germany's oldest churches, having been built between the 11th and 13th centuries. At one point the church served as the de facto cathedral for the Archbishopric of Cologne, because it is the major church of what was then the Archbishop-Elector's residence. It is now a minor basilica. It served as the inspiration for the Kaiser Wilhelm Memorial Church in Berlin, as Kaiser Wilhelm II had studied in Bonn.

== History ==
The basilica was built on the site of the graves of two martyrs Cassius and Florentius, the patrons of Bonn. They are piously believed to have been Roman legionaries of the Theban Legion. At some point during their march to Gaul, the legion refused to follow the emperor's orders either to kill the indigenous Christians or to worship Maximian as a god. As a result, a large number of legionaries were martyred in Agaunum, now named Saint Maurice-en-Valais after Saint Maurice. According to legend, Saints Cassius and Florentius, who were under the command of Saint Gereon, were beheaded for their religious beliefs at the present location of the Minster.

A memorial chapel was built in the early fourth century in what was a suburban cemetery about 1 km south of the Roman fortress. In the sixth century, a memorial building took its place. In the eighth century the Collegiate Church of SS. Cassius and Florentius" was built. The medieval town developed around the minster. A late Romanesque monastic church was constructed from 1140 to 1250. At one point the church served as the cathedral for the Archbishopric of Cologne. The cathedral was the model for the Gedächtniskirche in Berlin. On Pentecost Sunday 1956, the church was elevated to the status of a minor basilica.

A fund raising initiative was launched in 2014 for necessary renovations to the 1,000-year-old building to address cracks in the vault, water damage, and an aging electric service, among other concerns.

== Architecture ==
The church has square towers decorated with Lombard bands; a Romanesque feature, the minster also shows adaptation of some Gothic elements. Writer T. Francis Bumpus said, "The most beautiful stone spire in Germany is that of the minster at Bonn."

=== Interior ===
The Minster in Bonn housed one of the first organs in Germany, when in 1230 one was placed on the east wall in the north transept.

== Gallery ==
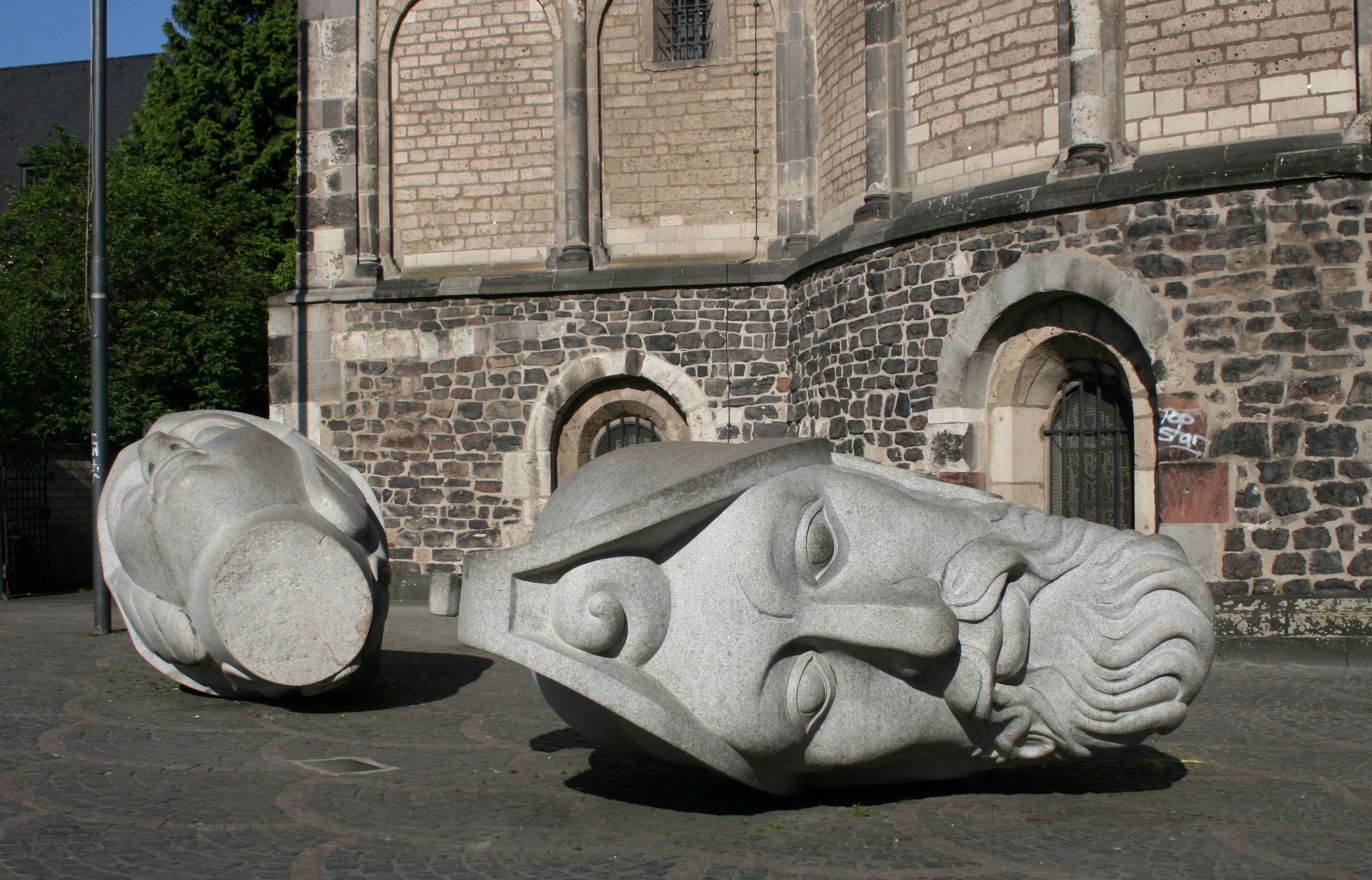
Sculptures of the legendary Cassius and Florentius in front of the church

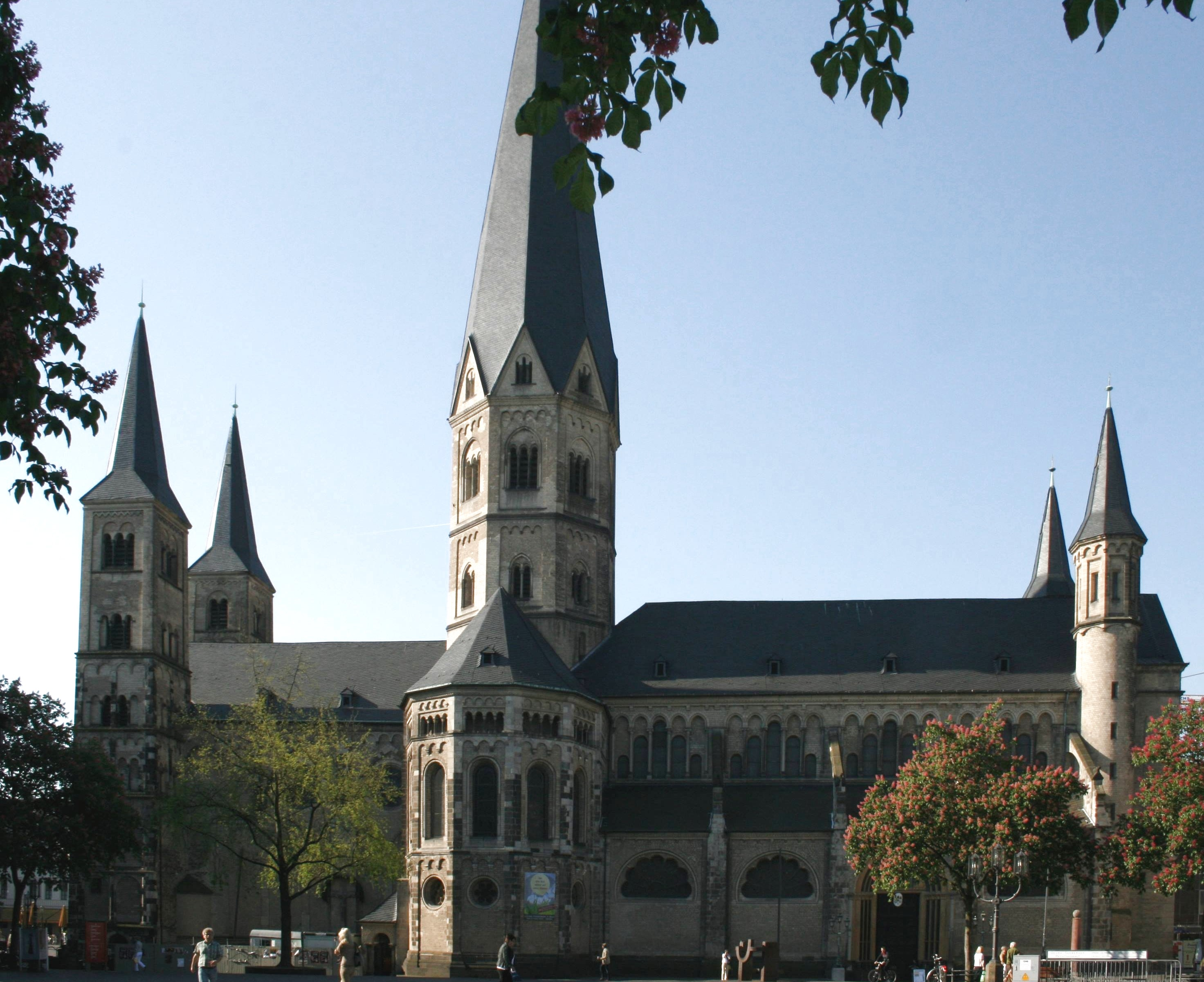
Exterior of the church

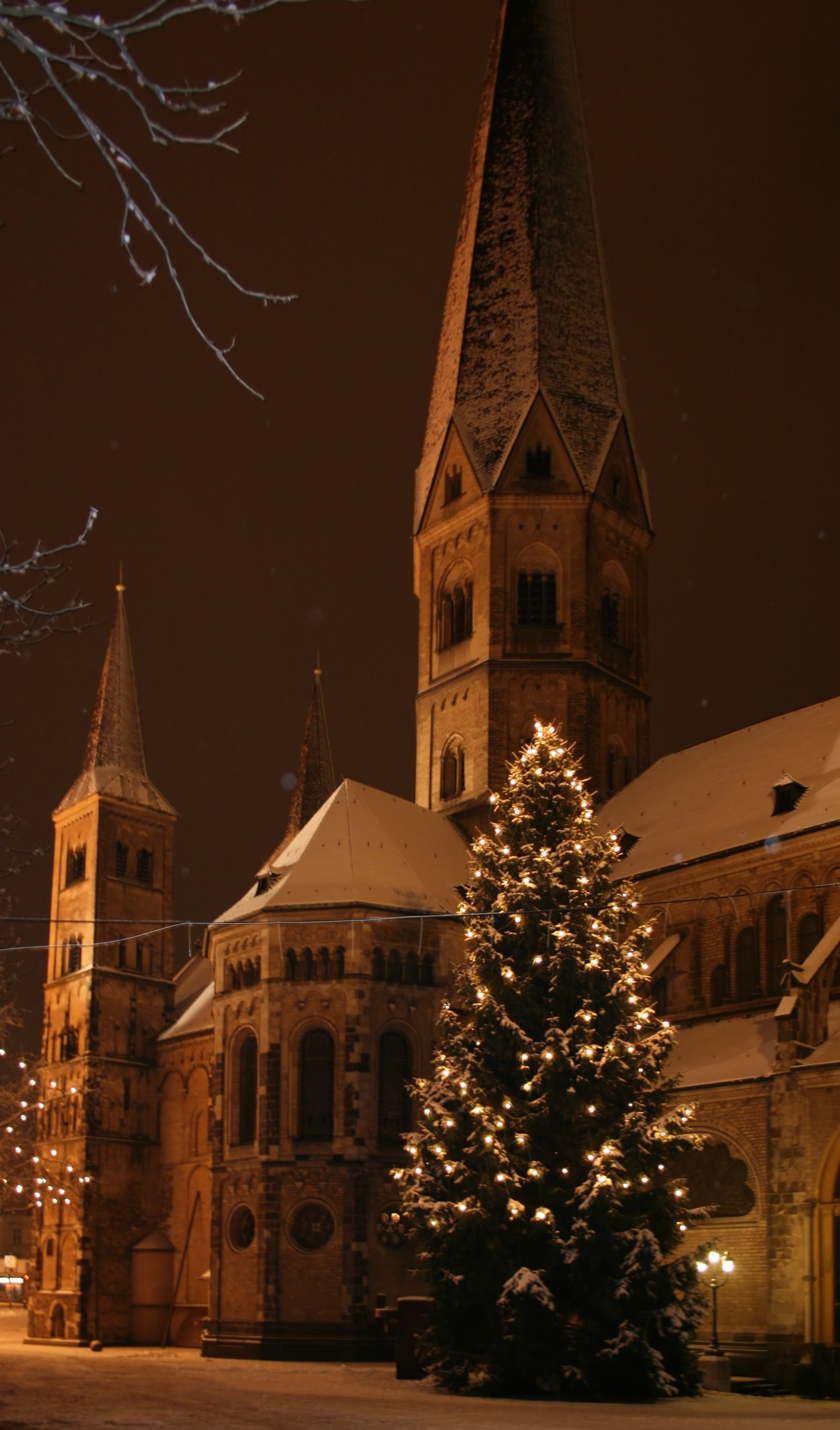
Transept and crossing tower

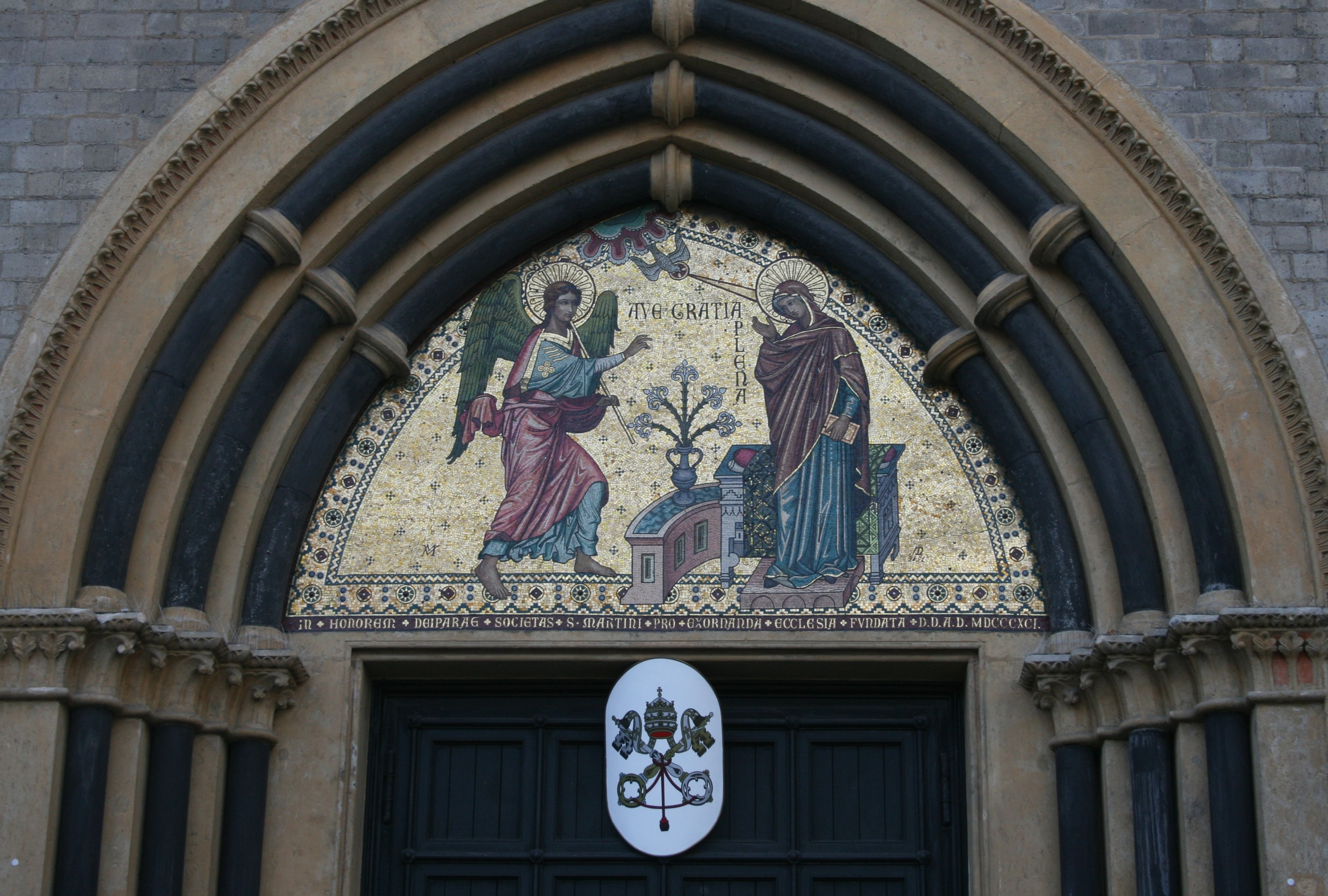
Detail of the main entrance with the coat of arms of the Holy See

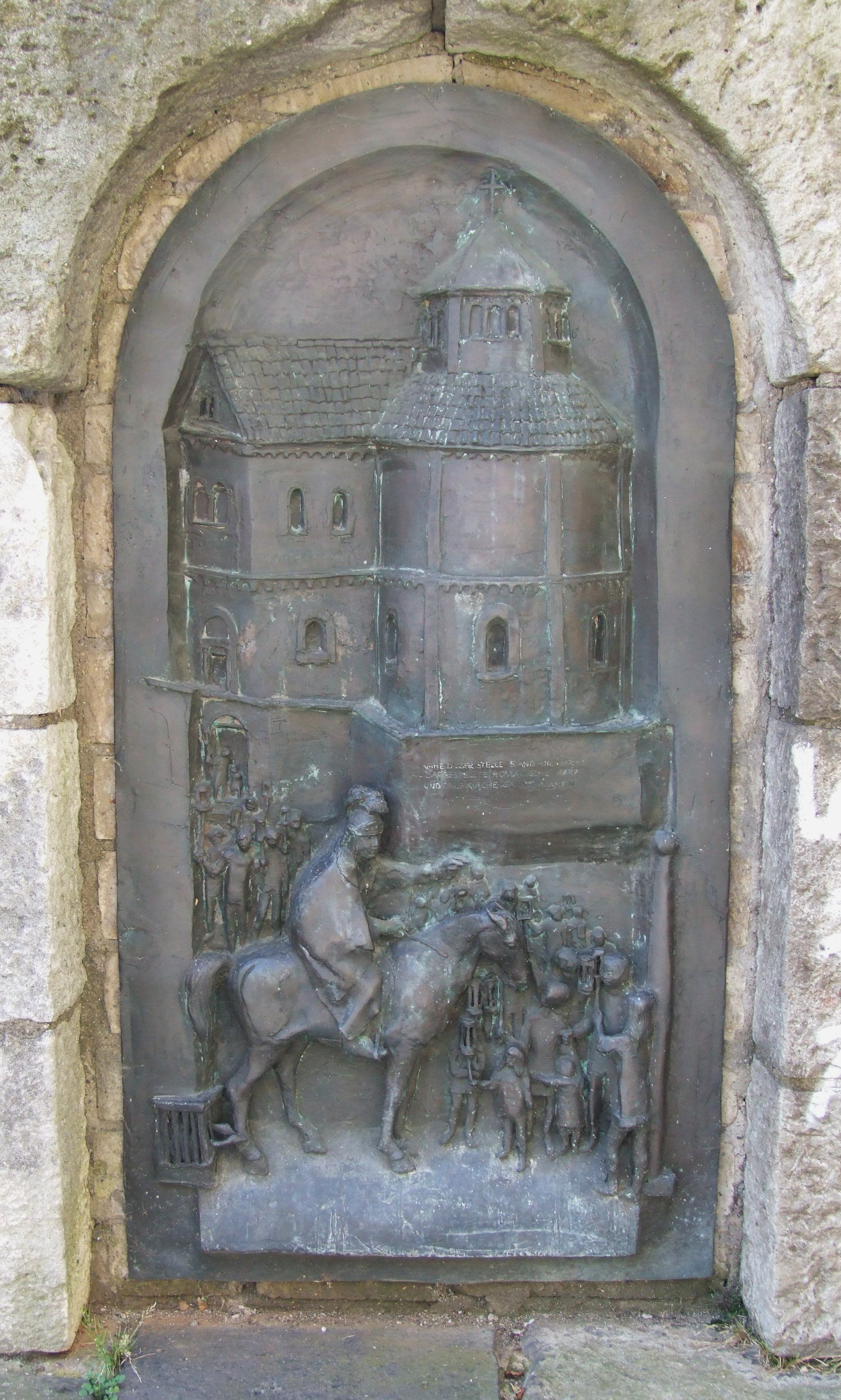
Equestrian relief of St. Martin of Tours

== See also ==
- List of basilica churches in Germany
