= Twelve Romanesque churches of Cologne =

Twelve landmark churches in the Old town of Cologne, Germany

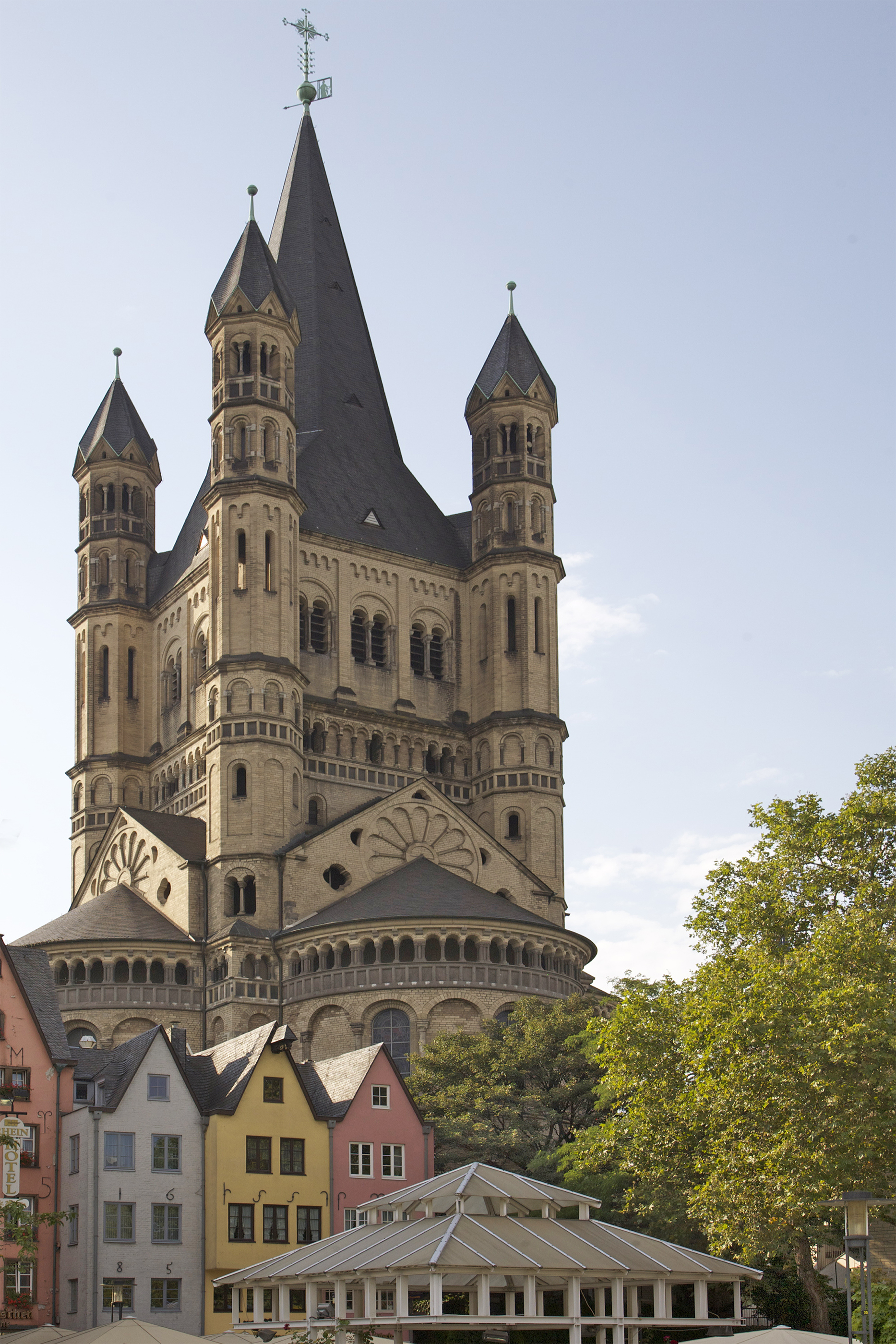
Great St. Martin Church, Cologne

The twelve Romanesque churches of Cologne are twelve landmark churches in the Old town (Altstadt) of Cologne, Germany. All twelve churches are Catholic.

The reason for the large number of churches was that in the Middle Ages Cologne was, along with Paris, the largest and most important city north of the Alps, and both were already important centers in Roman antiquity (Cologne's name was Colonia Claudia Ara Agrippinensium, the provincial capital of Germania Inferior). Christianity also has a long tradition in both cities; the first bishop of Paris was the missionary Dionysius of Paris (around 250), the first bishop of Cologne was Maternus of Cologne (c. 285-315 AD), a close confidant of Roman Emperor Constantine the Great.

The origins of some of these churches therefore go back as far as Roman times, for example St. Gereon, which was originally a huge mausoleum in a Roman graveyard, or St. Maria im Kapitol, built on the substructure of a Roman temple. Great St. Martin Church stands on the site of Roman warehouses and previously a sports field with a swimming pool, the walls of which can be seen in the basement of the church. The graves of two important women can be viewed in the churches: of Plectrude (died 718), the founder of the church St. Maria im Kapitol, and, in St. Pantaleon, of Empress Theophanu (died 991), a Byzantine princess who ruled the Holy Roman Empire forcefully and capably as dowager empress for her minor son. A 13th Romanesque church, St. Maria ad Gradus, which can be seen on a plan from 1571 and in later pictures, had already been demolished in 1817; she stood directly in front of the Cathedral choir.

With the exception of St. Maria Lyskirchen all of these churches were more or less severely damaged by the bombing of Cologne during the Second World War. Reconstruction was only finished in the 1990s. Some of the churches survived the bombings with considerable damage to their structural integrity, but without too much actual destruction, such as St. Gereon's, which also contains significant ancient Roman masonry.

== Churches ==
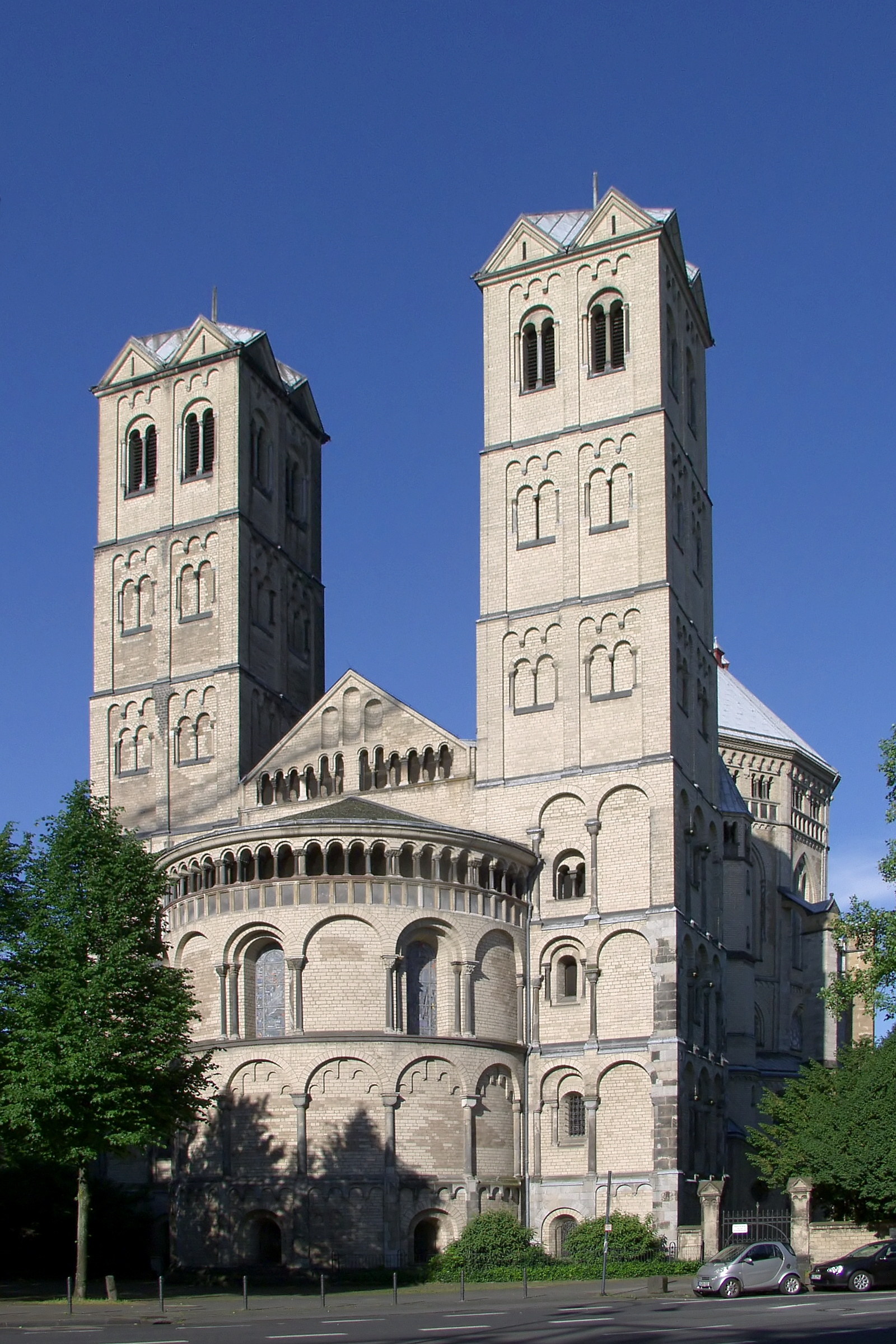
St. Gereon

The twelve churches are:^{1}

- St. Andreas in Altstadt-Nord, est. 974
- St. Aposteln in Altstadt-Nord, est. 9th century
- St. Cecilia's in Altstadt-Süd, est. 9th century
- St. Georg in Altstadt-Süd, est. 11th century
- St. Gereon in Altstadt-Nord, est. before 612
- St. Kunibert in Altstadt-Nord, est. 1247
- St. Maria im Kapitol in Altstadt-Süd, est. 690
- St. Maria Lyskirchen in Altstadt-Süd, est. 948
- Great St. Martin in Altstadt-Nord, est. 10th century
- St. Pantaleon in Altstadt-Süd, est. controversial
- St. Severin in Altstadt-Süd, est. 4th century and
- St. Ursula in Altstadt-Nord, est. early 5th century

^{1}sorted alphabetically

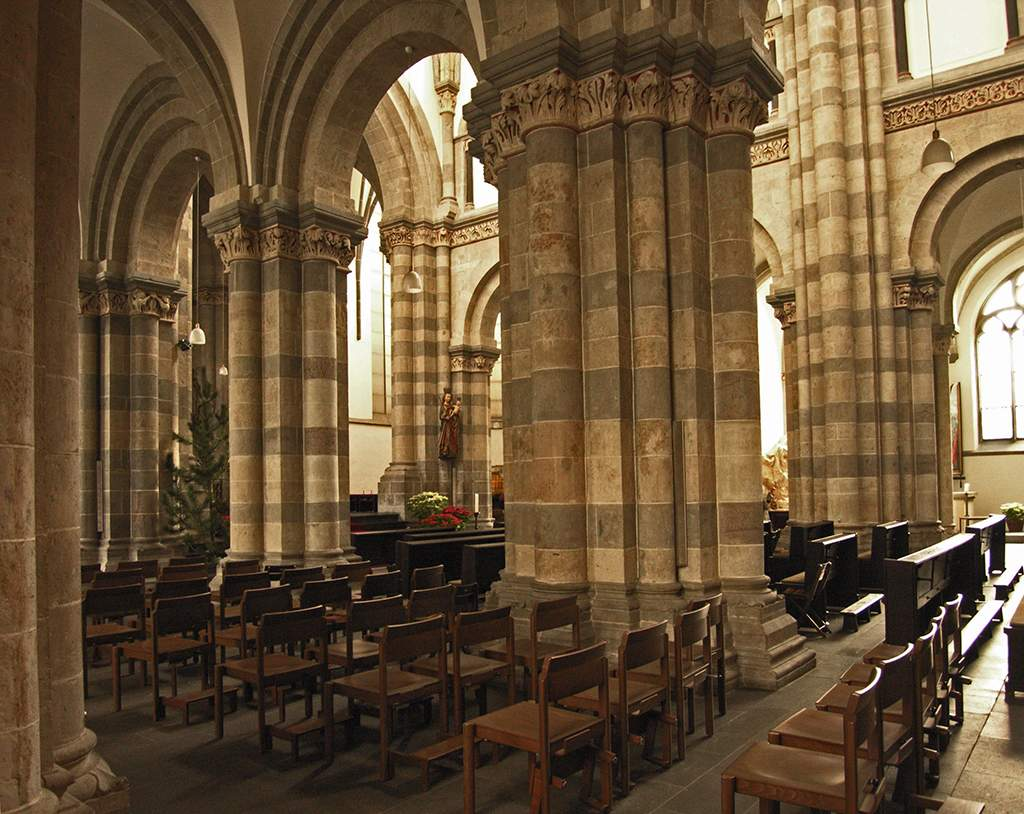
Interior of St. Andreas

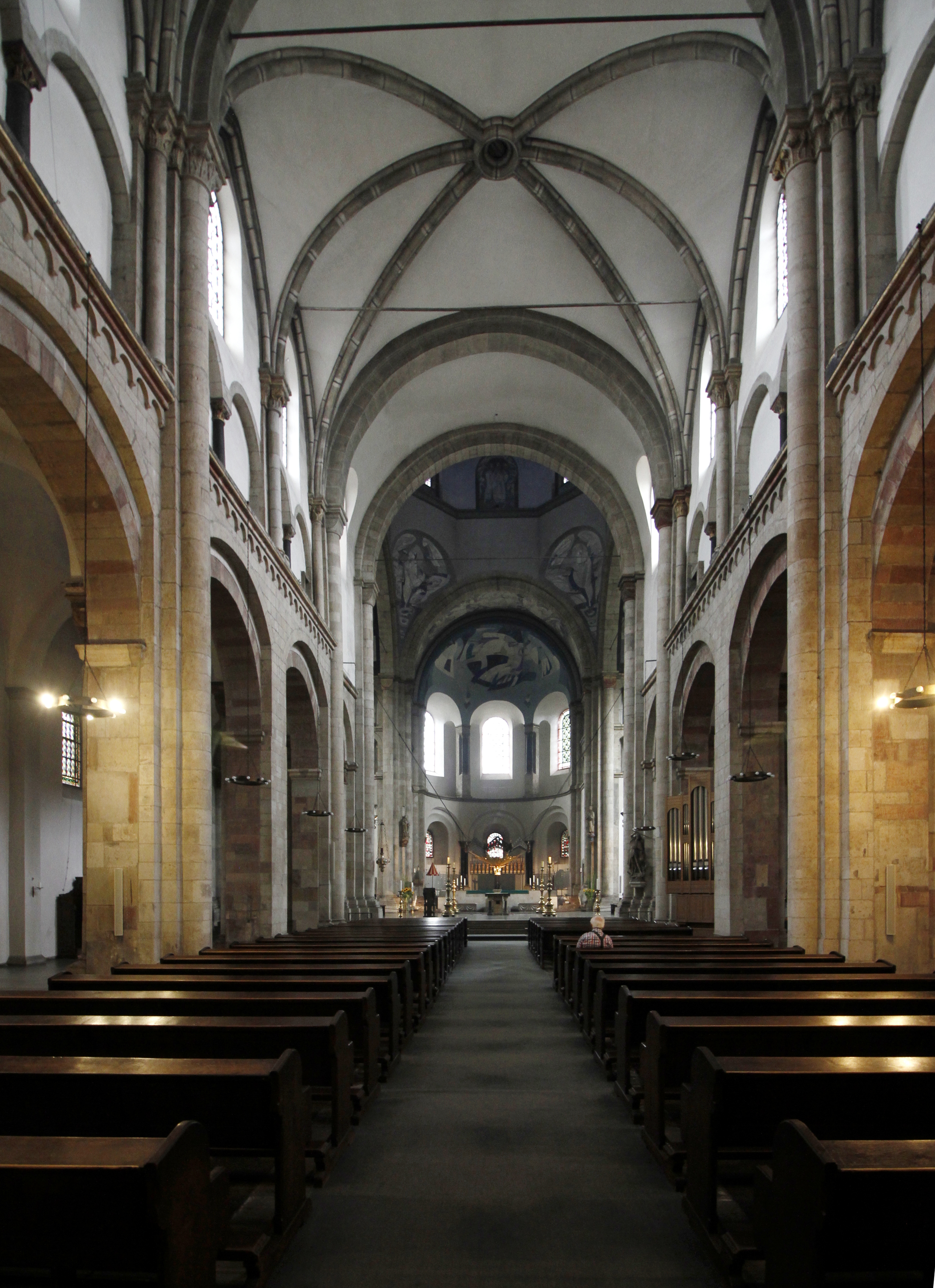
Interior of St. Aposteln

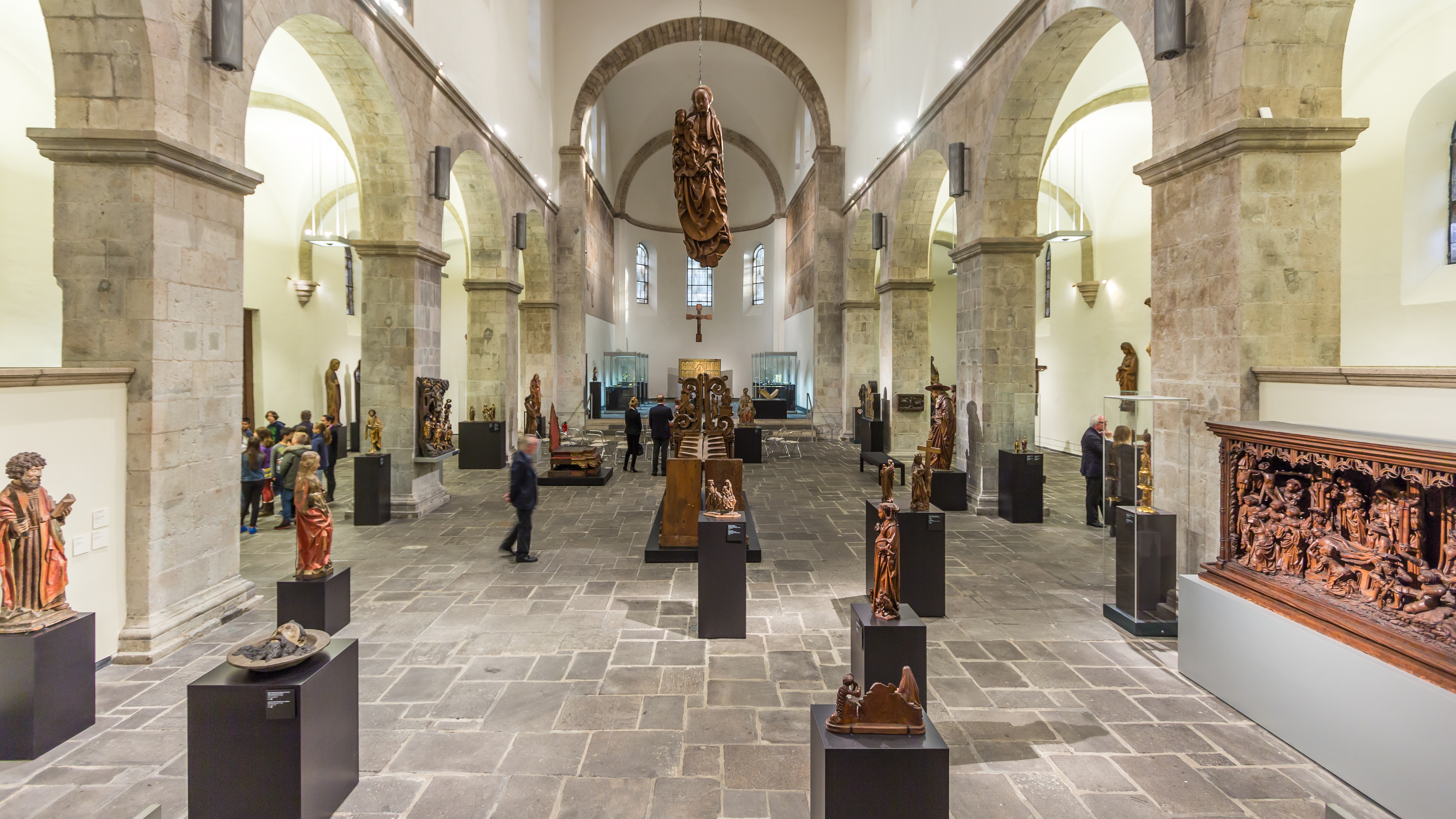
Interior of St. Cecilia

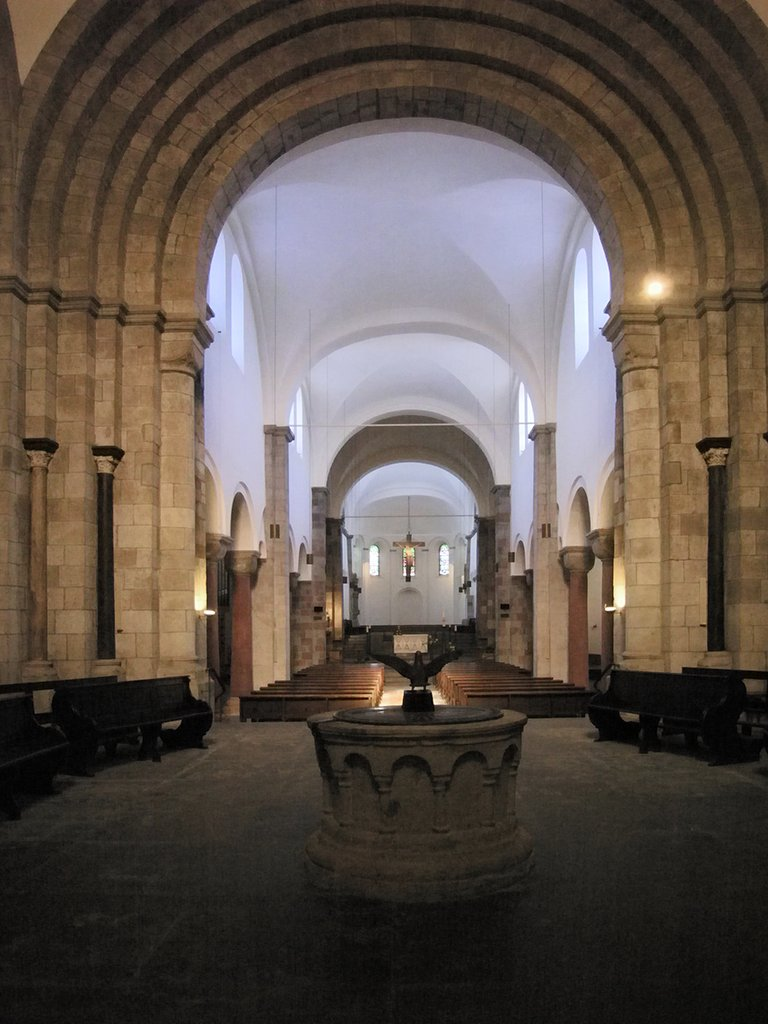
Interior of St. Georg

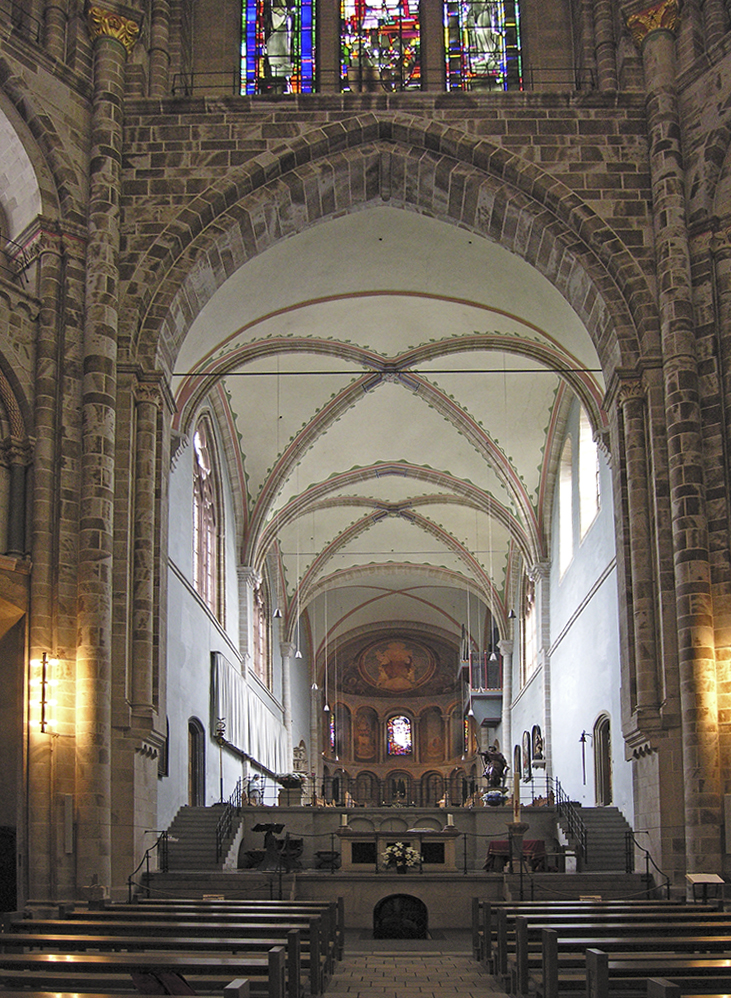
Interior of St. Gereon

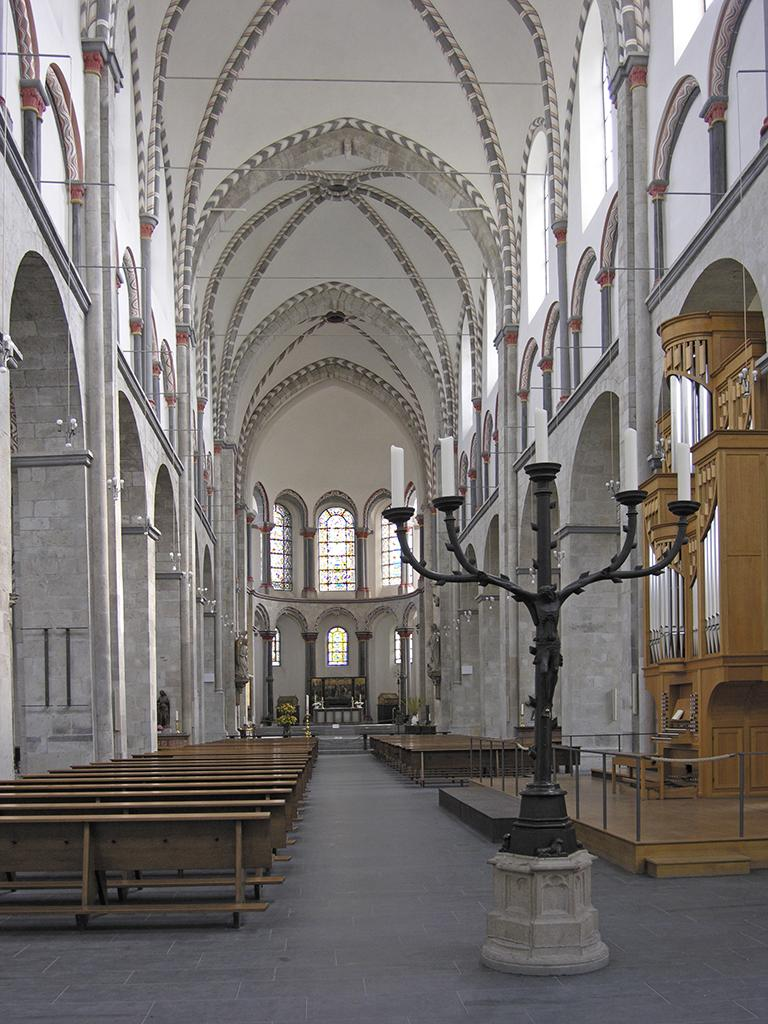
Interior of St. Kunibert

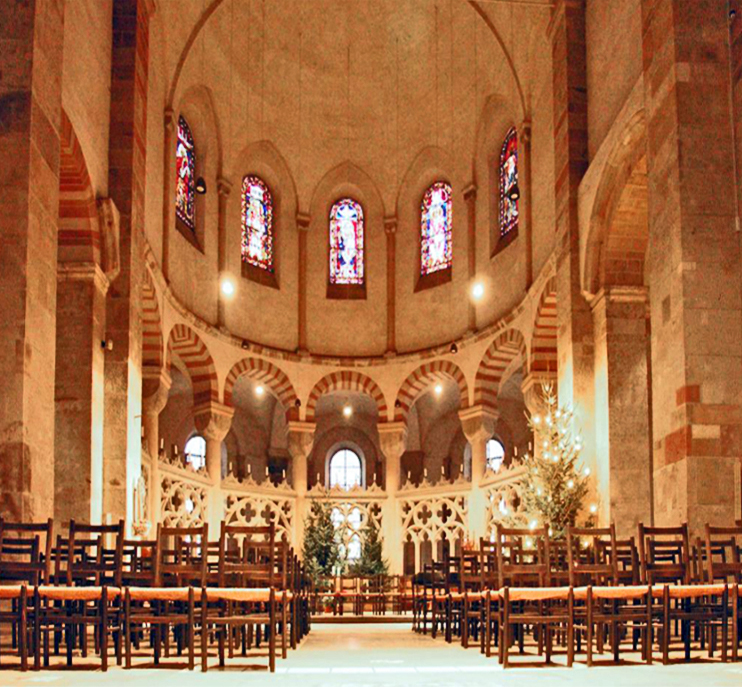
Interior of St. Maria im Kapitol

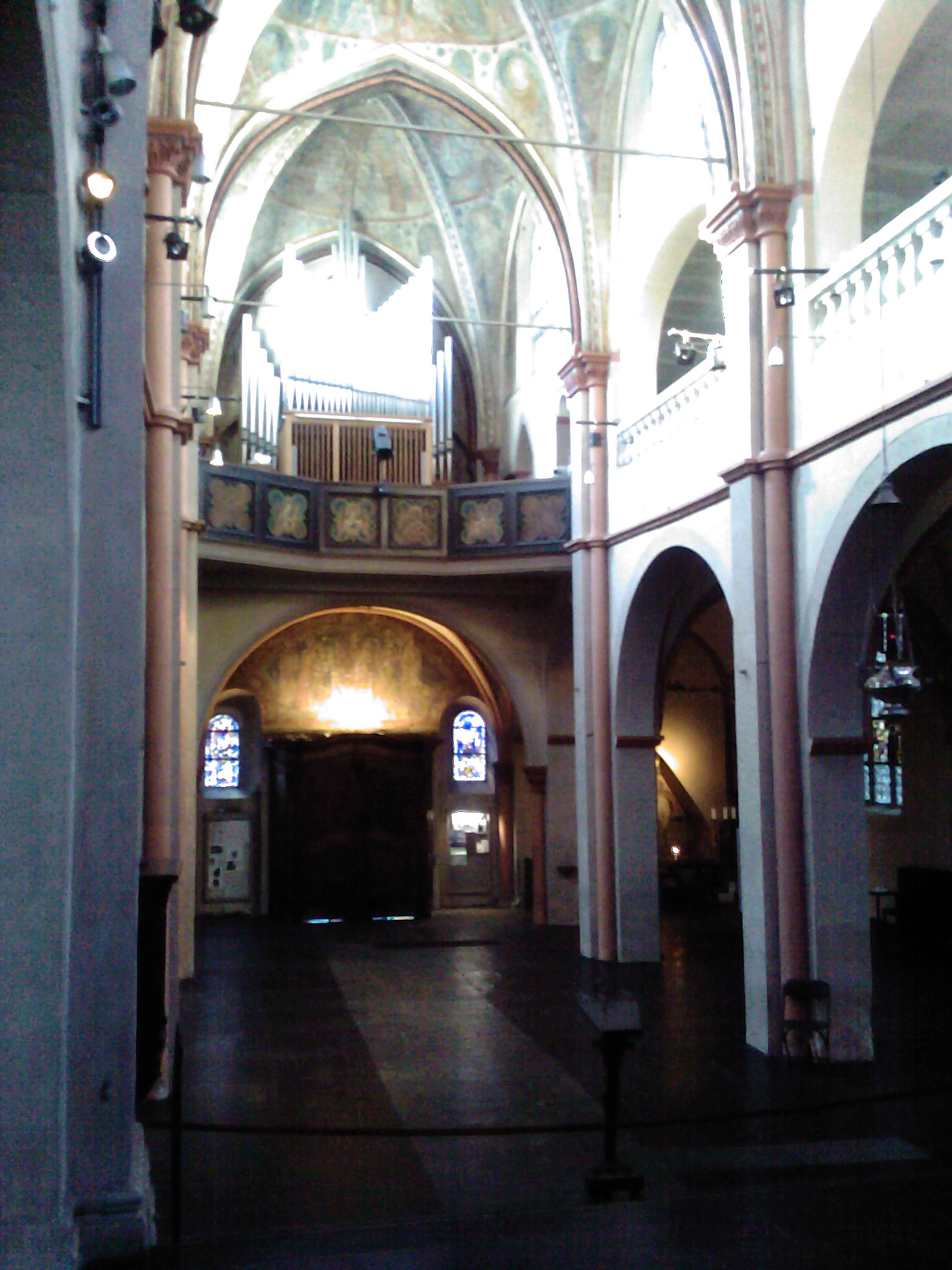
Interior of St. Maria in Lyskirchen

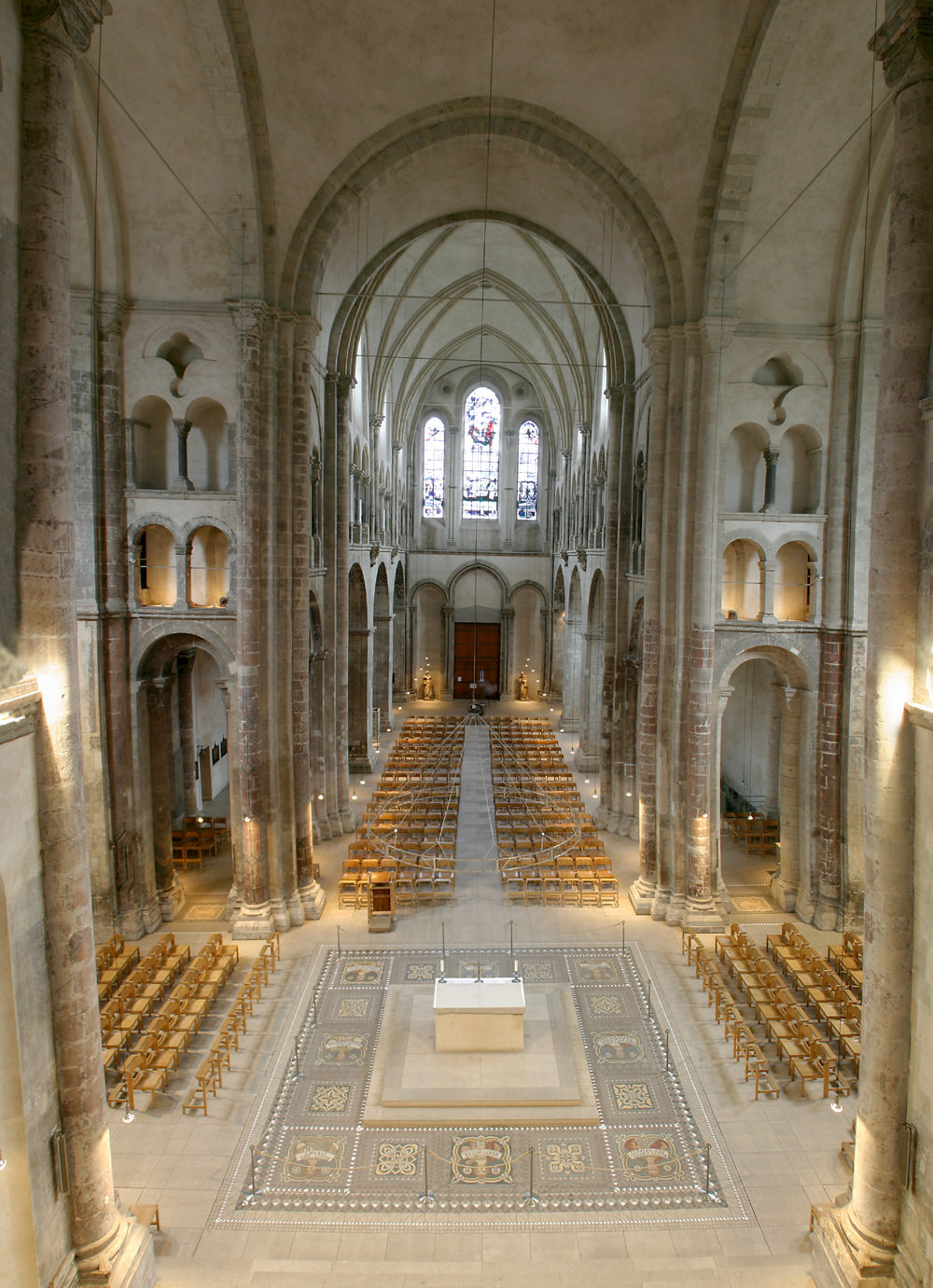
Interior of Great St. Martin

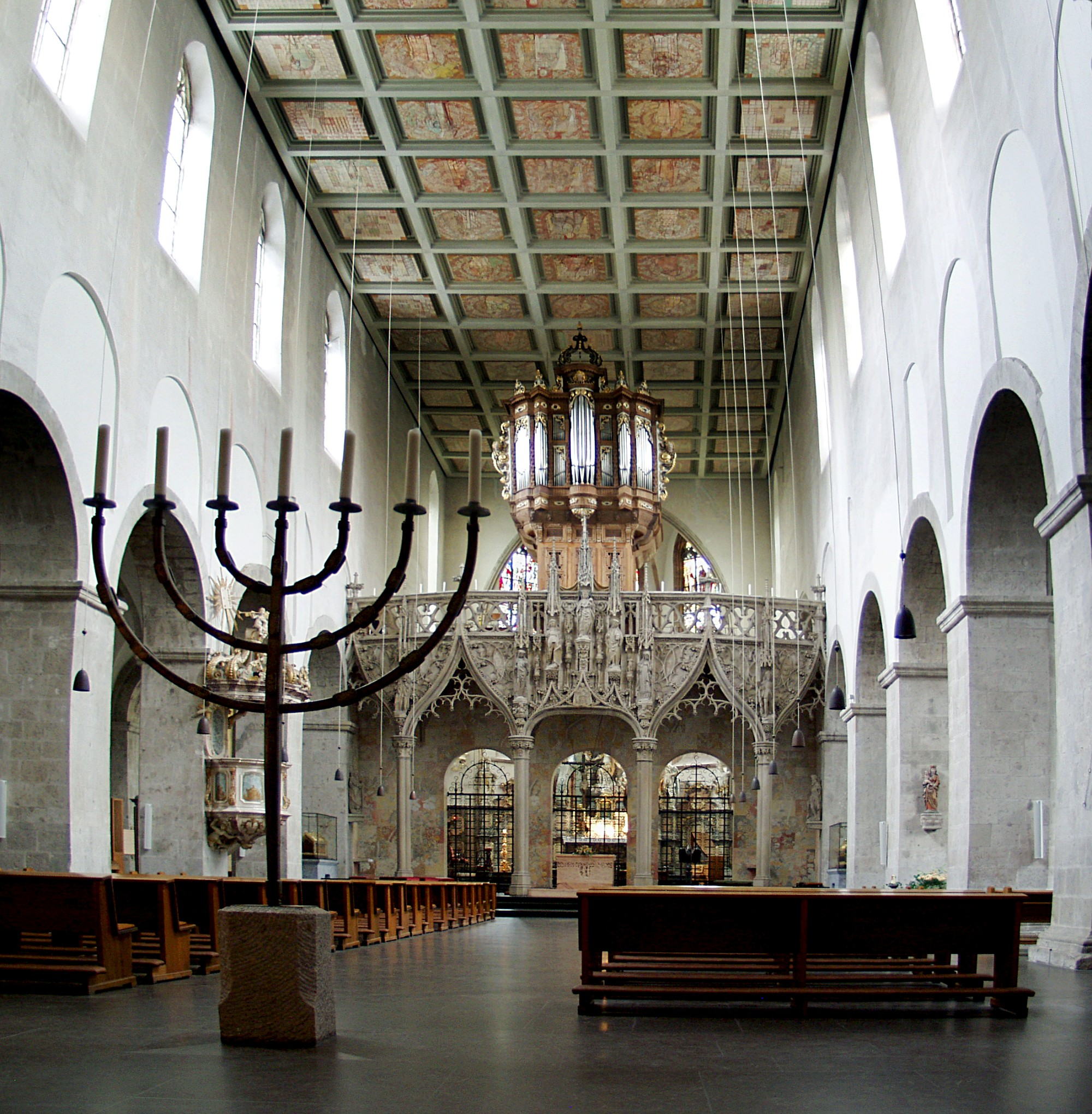
Interior of St. Pantaleon

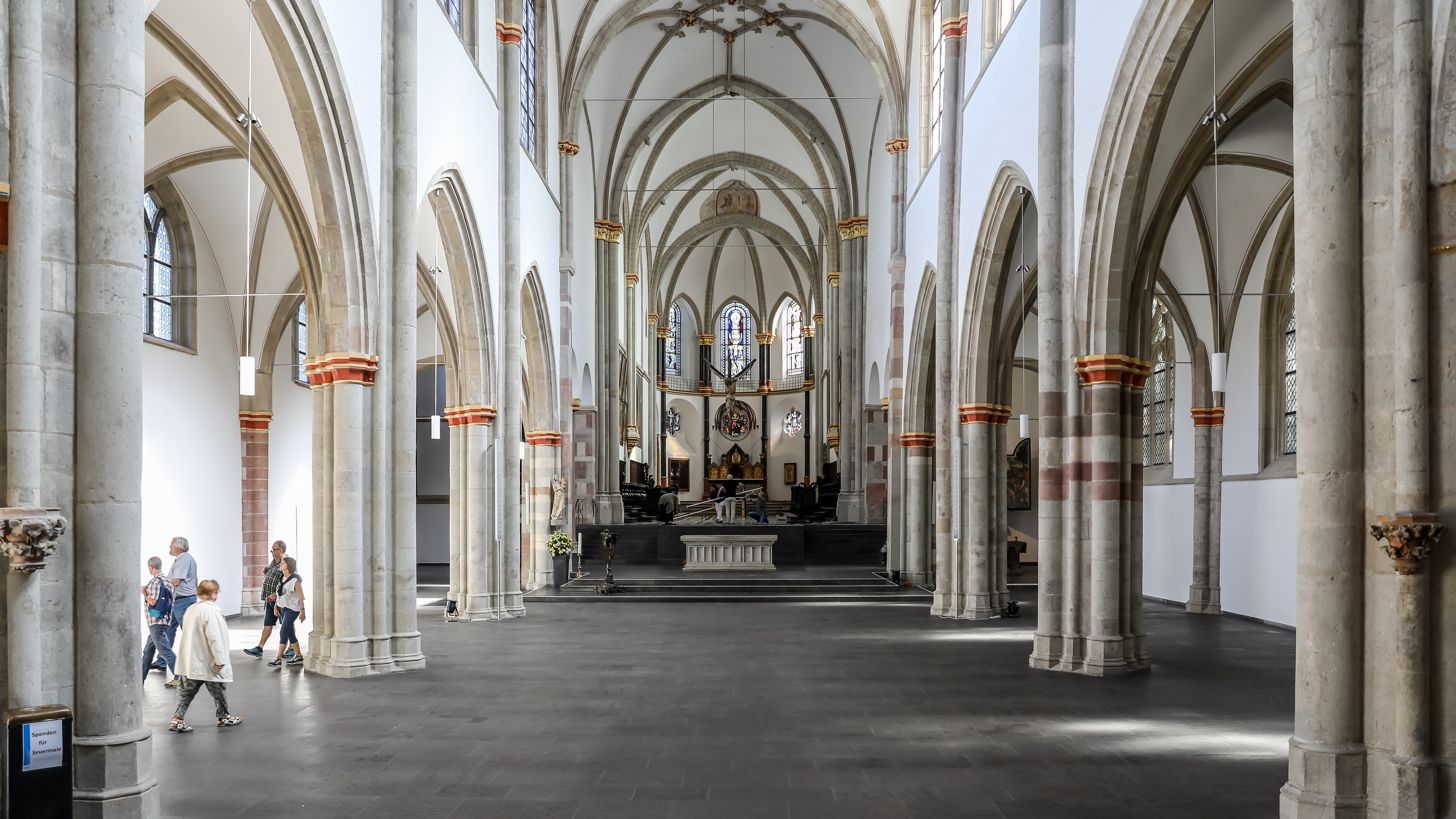
Interior of St. Severin

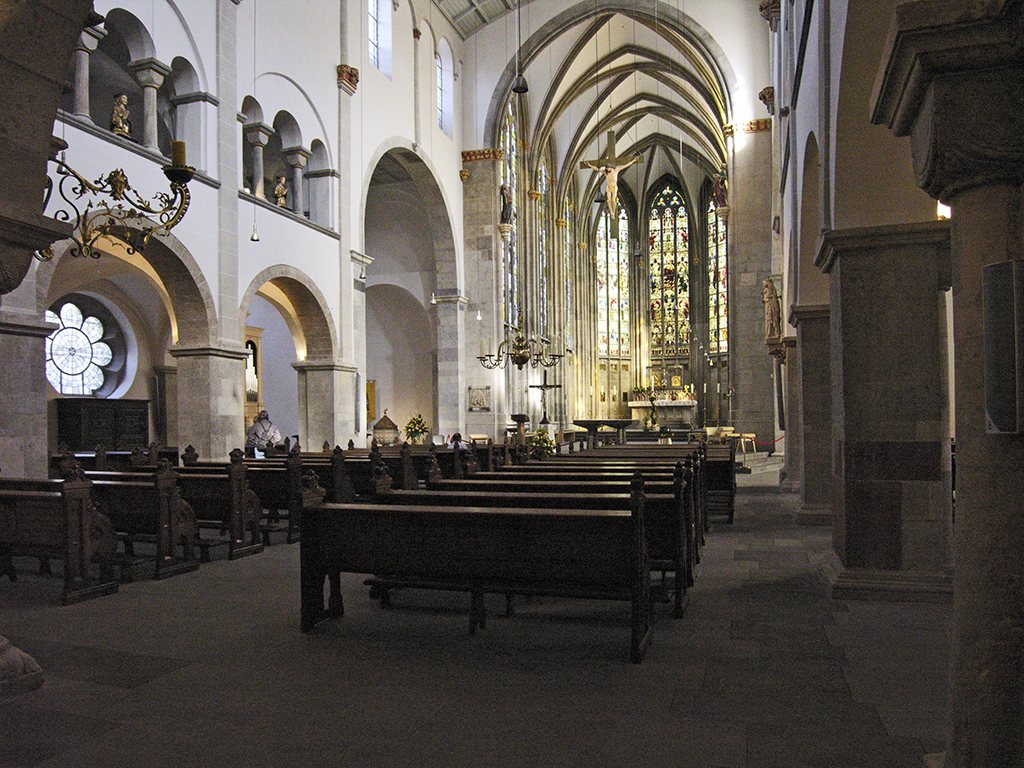
Interior of St. Ursula

== Other churches ==
Also sponsored by the Förderverein Romanische Kirchen Köln e.V. (Friends of Romanesque Churches of Cologne) are twelve Romanesque churches outside of the Old Town, as well as St. Peter's Church, Cologne:

- Alt St. Heribert in Deutz
- St. Nikolaus in Dünnwald
- St. Martinus in Esch
- St. Stephan in Lindenthal
- St. Severin in Lövenich
- St. Brictius in Merkenich
- St. Michael in Niederzündorf
- Alt St. Katharina in Niehl
- St. Martin in Oberzündorf
- St. Cornalius in Rath/Heumar
- St. Amandus in Rheinkassel
- Alt St. Maternus in Rodenkirchen
- St. Nikolaus in Westhoven

== See also ==
- Cologne Cathedral
- German architecture
- Romanesque architecture
- List of regional characteristics of Romanesque churches
- Romanesque secular and domestic architecture

== Literature ==
- Hiltrud Kier: Via Sacra zu Fuß, Kölns Städtebau und die Romanischen Kirchen. Bachem Verlag, Köln 2003 (²/2005) ISBN 3-7616-1704-6.
- Ulrich Krings, Otmar Schwab: Köln: Die Romanischen Kirchen – Zerstörung und Wiederherstellung. Reihe Stadtspuren Bd. 2, Köln, Bachem Verlag, 2007 (712 S. mit CD Chronologie des Wiederaufbaus).
- Sybille Fraquelli: Zwölf Tore zum Himmel. Kinder entdecken: Die Romanischen Kirchen in Köln. J.P. Bachem Verlag, Köln 2007. ISBN 978-3-7616-2148-6
- Hiltrud Kier und Ulrich Krings: Die Romanischen Kirchen in Köln, Köln, 3.Auflage 1986.
- Sabine Czymmek: Die Kölner Romanischen Kirchen, Schatzkunst, Bd. 1, Köln 2008, Bd. 2, Köln 2009 (= Colonia Romanica, Jahrbuch des Fördervereins Romanische Kirchen Köln e. V. Bd. 22, 2007 und 23, 2008)
