= Basilica of St. Ursula, Cologne =

Church building in Altstadt-Nord, Germany

Coordinates: 50°56′45″N 6°57′16″E

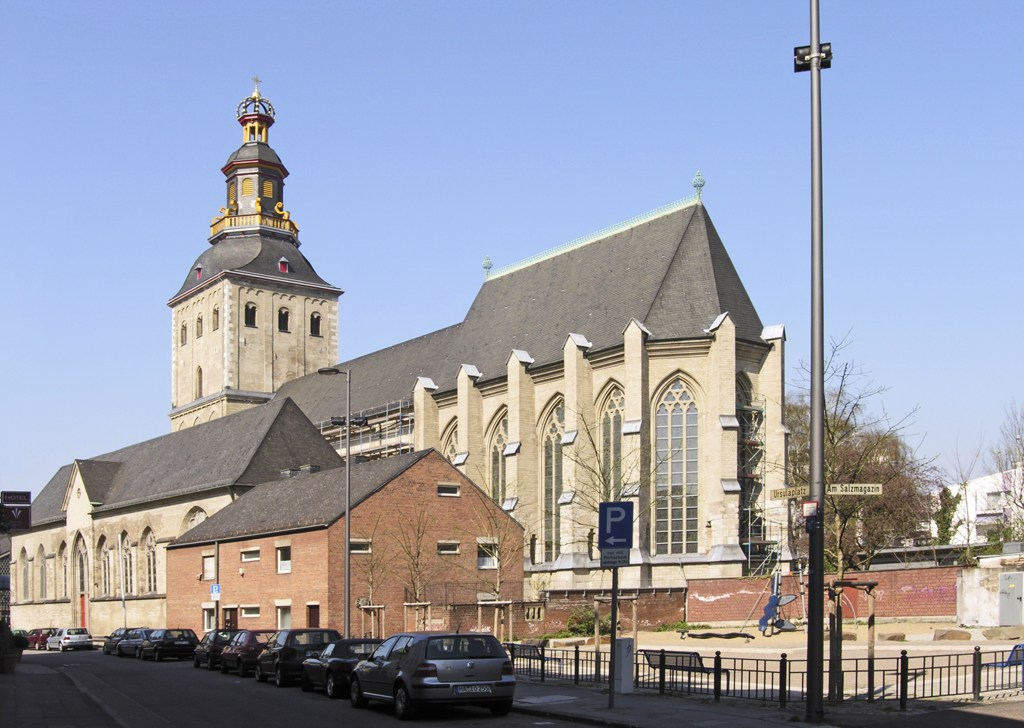
Church from the east

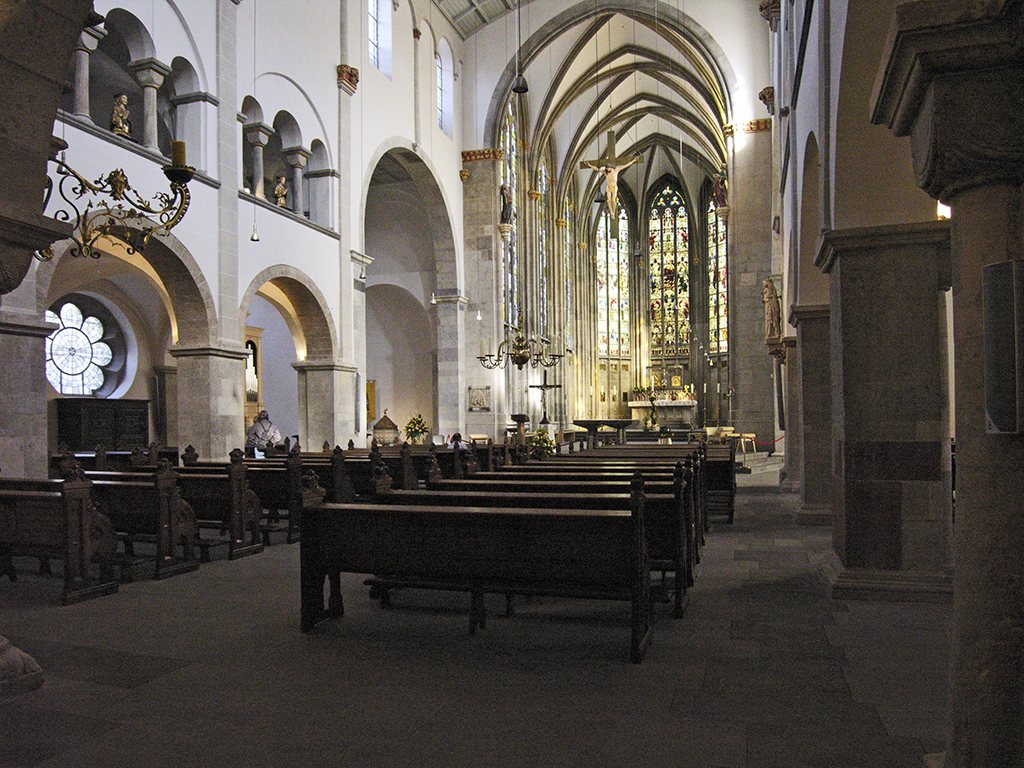
Interior of St. Ursula

The Basilica church of St. Ursula (German: [ˌzaŋkt ˈʔʊʁzula]; Kölsch: Zint Oschele [ˌtsɪ̂nt ˈʔôʒələ]) is located in Cologne, North Rhine-Westphalia, Germany. It is built upon the ancient ruins of a Roman cemetery, where the 11,000 virgins associated with the legend of Saint Ursula are said to have been buried. The church has an impressive reliquary created from the bones of the former occupants of the cemetery. It is one of the twelve Romanesque churches of Cologne and was designated a Minor Basilica on 25 June 1920. While the nave and main tower are Romanesque, the choir has been rebuilt in the Gothic style.

== The Golden Chamber ==
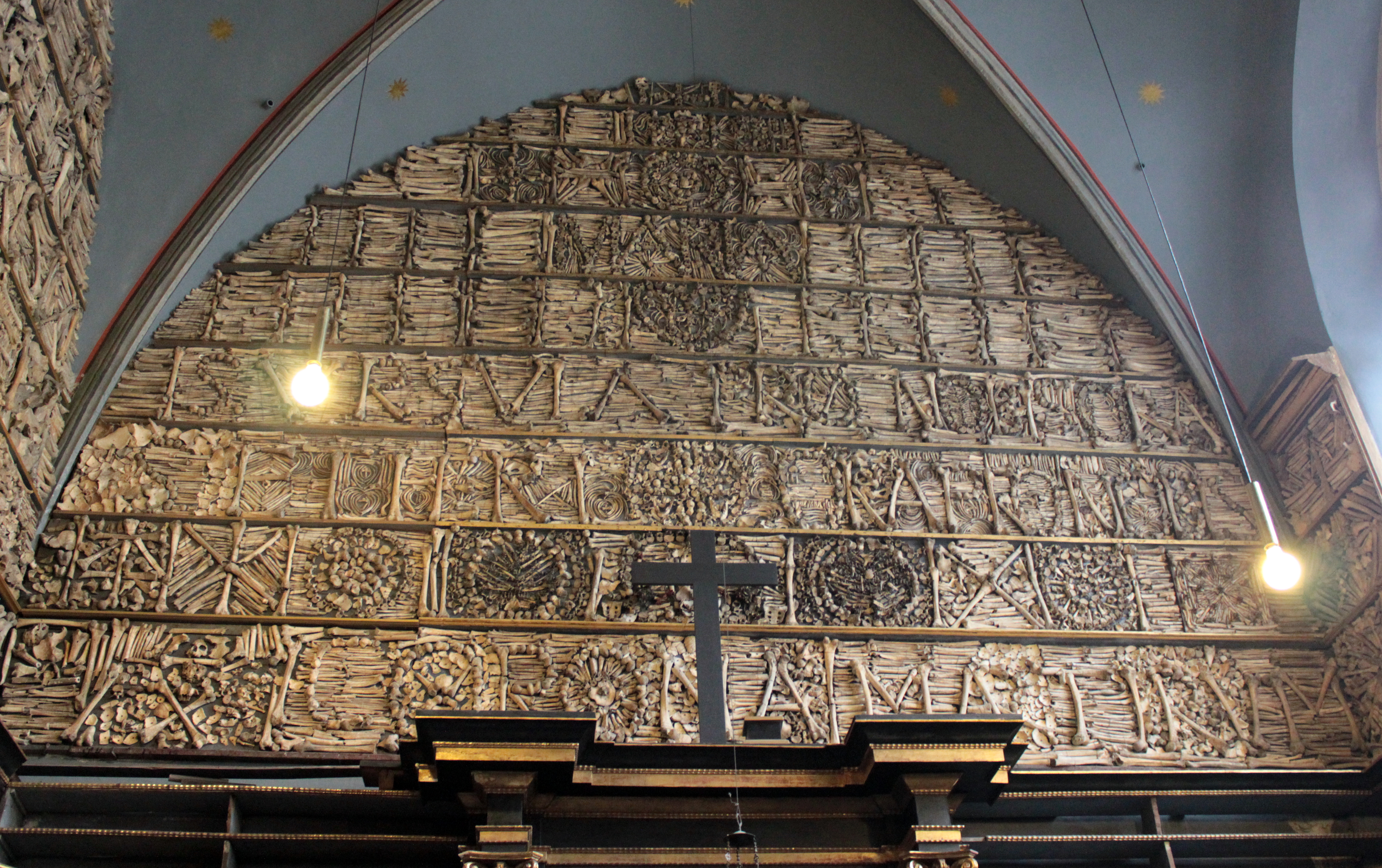
One of the walls of bones in the Golden Chamber

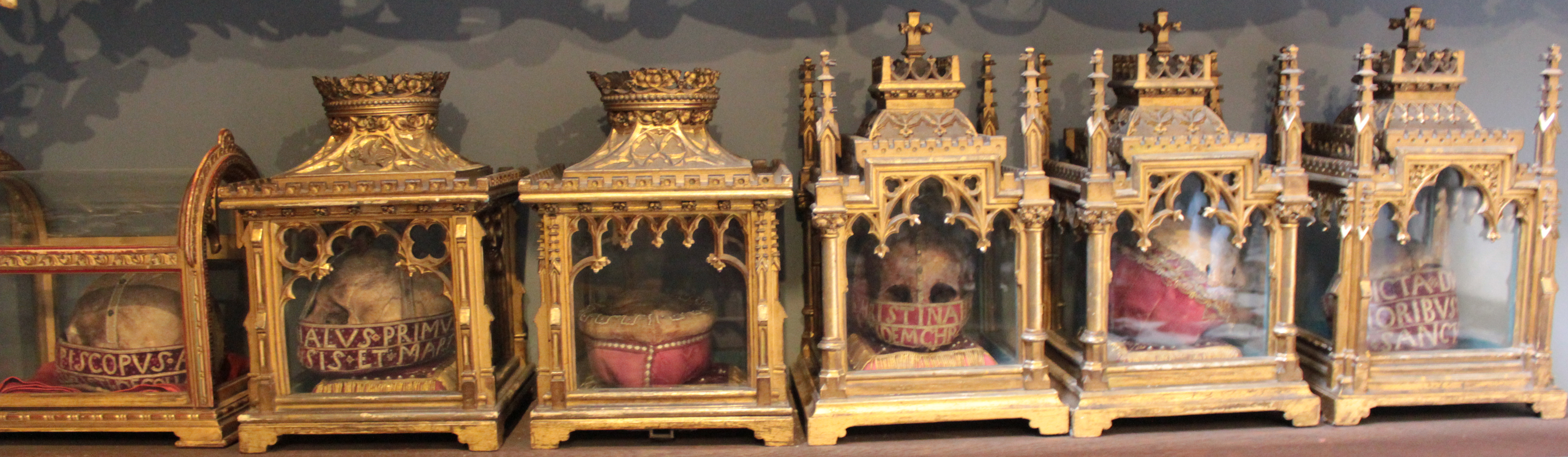
A portion of the collection of skull relics in the Golden Chamber

The Golden Chamber, or Goldene Kammer, of the church contains the alleged remains of St. Ursula and her 11,000 virgins who are said to have been killed by the Huns, possibly around the time of the Battle of the Catalaunian Plains.

There are various theories relating to the origin of the legend of the 11,000 virgins - one is that the original legend said 11 virgins accompanied St. Ursula, but later readings misread the abbreviation "M" for martyrs as Latin numeral "M" for 1000, which over time led to 11,000.

The walls of the Golden Chamber are covered in bones arranged in designs and/or letters along with relic skulls. The exact number of people whose remains are in the Golden Chamber remains ambiguous but the number of skulls in the reliquary is greater than 11 and less than 11,000. These remains were found in 1106 in a mass grave and were assumed to be those of the legend of St. Ursula and the 11,000 virgins. Therefore, the church constructed the Golden Chamber to house the bones. The bones themselves are neatly arranged in "zigzags and swirls and even in the shapes of Latin words."

== See also ==
- Twelve Romanesque churches of Cologne
- List of basilica churches in Germany
- Victor von Carben
- Saint Ursula
- Cologne Cathedral
- German architecture
- Romanesque architecture
- List of regional characteristics of Romanesque churches
- Romanesque secular and domestic architecture

== Literature ==
- Heinz Firmenich: St. Ursula und die Maria-Ablaß-Kapelle in Köln. Rheinischer Verein für Denkmalpflege und Landschaftsschutz, Köln 1976, ISBN 3-88094-150-5
- Werner Schäfke: Kölns romanische Kirchen. Architektur Kunst Geschichte. Emons, Köln 2004, ISBN 3-89705-321-7
- Hiltrud Kier, Ulrich Krings: Die Romanischen Kirchen in Köln, Vista Point Verlag, Köln 1991, ISBN 3-88973-601-7
- Gernot Nürnberger: Die Ausgrabungen in St. Ursula zu Köln Dissertation, Friedrich-Wilhelms-Universität, Bonn 2002
- Sabine Czymmek, Die Kölner romanischen Kirchen, Schatzkunst, Bd. 2, Köln 2009 (= Colonia Romanica, Jahrbuch des Fördervereins Romanische Kirchen Köln e. V., Bd. XXIII, 2008), S. 225–289, ISBN 978-3-7743-0422-2
