= Basilica of St. Severin, Cologne =

Church building in Altstadt-Süd, Germany

Coordinates: 50°55′25″N 6°57′35″E

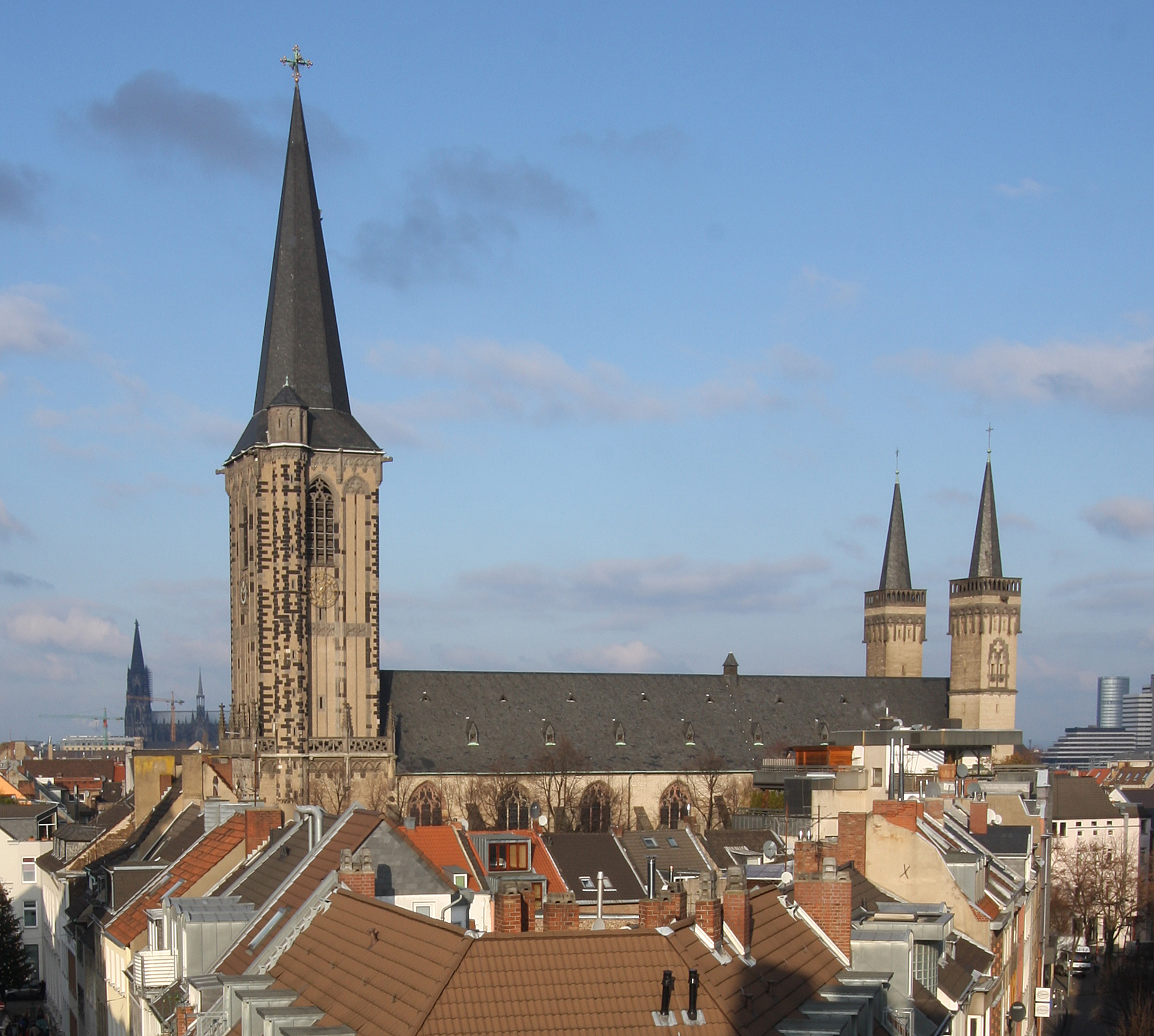
St. Severin as seen from Severinstor (2009). The church's tower reaches a height of 72.90 metres (239.2 ft).

The Basilica of St. Severin (German: Basilika St. Severin [ˌzaŋkt zeveˈʁiːn, - ˈzeːveʁiːn]; Kölsch: Zint Frings [ˌtsɪ̂nt ˈfʁɪ̂ŋs]) is an early Romanesque basilica church located in the Südstadt of Cologne (Köln). The former collegiate church is dedicated to St. Severin of Cologne. It is one of the twelve Romanesque churches of Cologne.

St. Severin was established in the late 4th century as a memorial chapel and extended several times. The oldest parts of today's building date back to the 10th century. It was designated a Basilica Minor by Pope Pius XII in 1953.

== See also ==
- Twelve Romanesque churches of Cologne
- List of basilica churches in Germany
- Cologne Cathedral
- German architecture
- Romanesque architecture
- List of regional characteristics of Romanesque churches
- Romanesque secular and domestic architecture
