= Basilica of the Visitation of Our Lady, Werl =

Coordinates: 51°33′14″N 7°54′54″E

Basilica of Our Lady of Visitation
- Basilika Mariä Heimsuchung
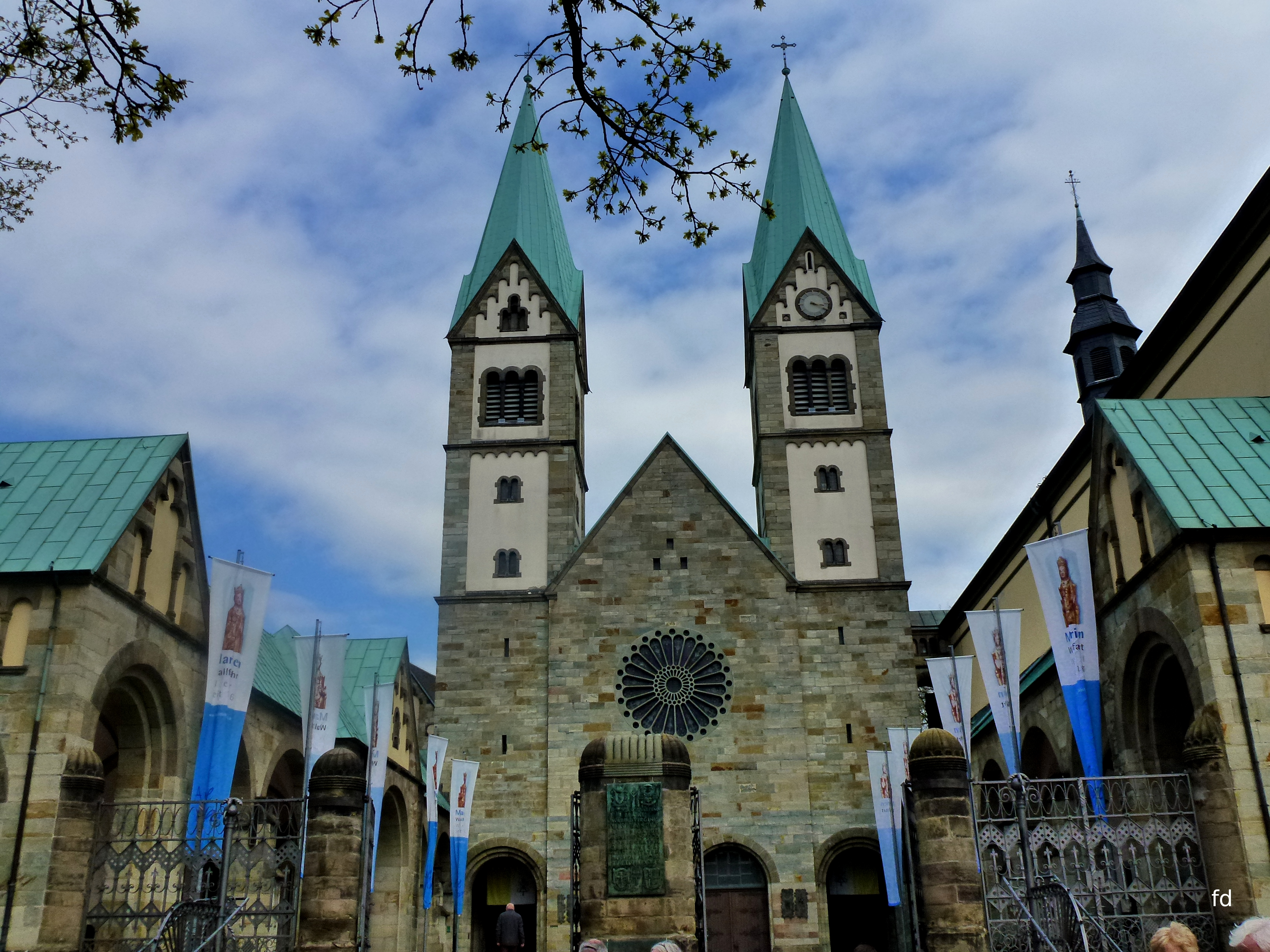

- Location within North Rhine-Westphalia Location within Germany
- Location: Werl, North Rhine-Westphalia
- Country: Germany
- Denomination: Roman Catholic Church

The Basilica of the Visitation of Our Lady (German: Basilika Mariä Heimsuchung) also called Werl Basilica is a Catholic church located in Werl, Germany which was declared a minor basilica in 1953. It is dedicated to the Visitation of Mary.

The church was built in 1904-1906 according to the plans of the chief architect of the diocese of Münster, Wilhelm-Sunder Plaßmann in Neo-Romantic style. The temple houses the pious statue of the Virgin of Werle, also called “Afflictorum Consolatrix” (English: Consolation of the afflicted), dating from the twelfth century. Bishop Karl Joseph Schulte consecrated the church on 24 May 1911.

Pope Pius X granted the venerated Marian image a canonical coronation on 13 August 1911, executed by Archbishop of Cologne, Cardinal Anton Hubert Fischer and Cardinal Karl Joseph Schulte von Paderborn. The reading of the Pontifical decree and sermon was assigned to the Franciscan bishop of Nepi—Sutri, Giuseppe Bernardo Doebbing.

Pope Pius XII raised her sanctuary to the status of Basilica via another decree Quam Omnes Gentes and redeclared the coronation on 16 October 1953, which was notarized by the Grand Chancellor of Apostolic Briefs, Monsignor Gildo Brugnola.

The Franciscans of Werl since 1848 are the guardians of the pilgrimage church and the Basilica of the Visitation. Its convent rebuilt in the 19th century is next door.

The basilica has been restored several times during the twentieth century and especially in the period 2002 to 2003.

== See also ==
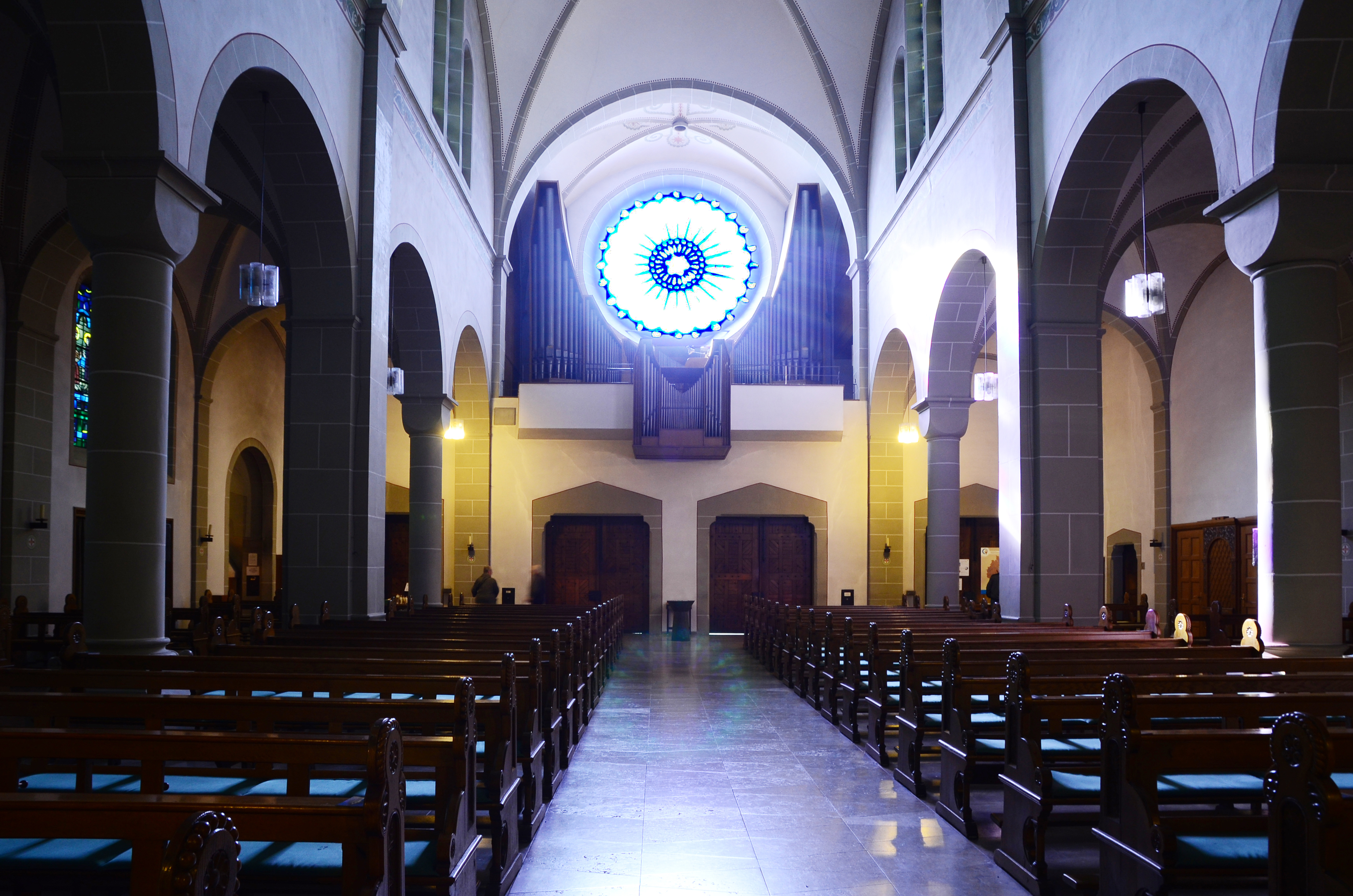
Internal view

- Roman Catholicism in Germany
- Visitation
