= Basilica of the Holy Apostles, Cologne =

Romanesque church in Cologne, Germany

Coordinates: 50°56′12″N 6°56′42″E

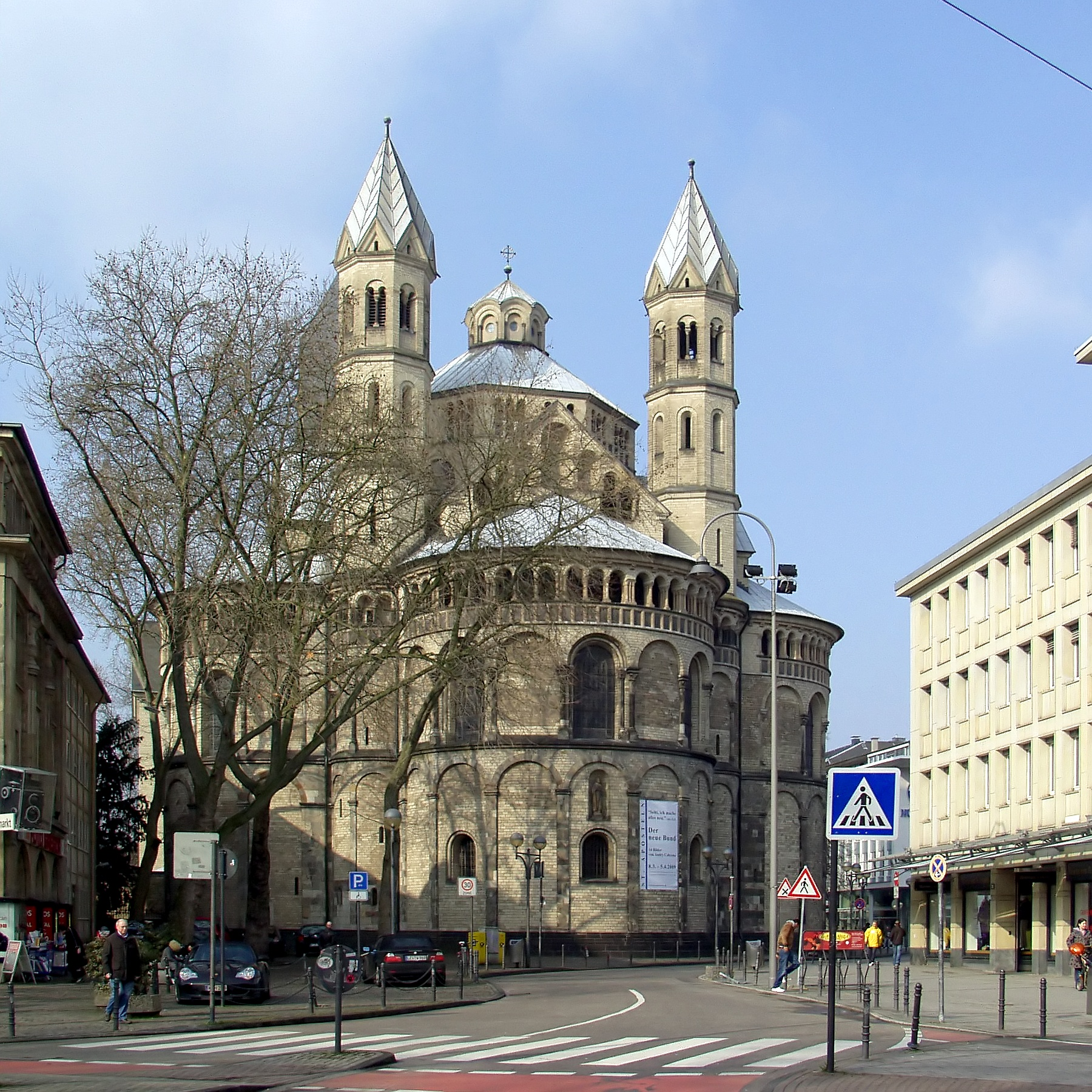
Exterior view of the east side of St. Aposteln

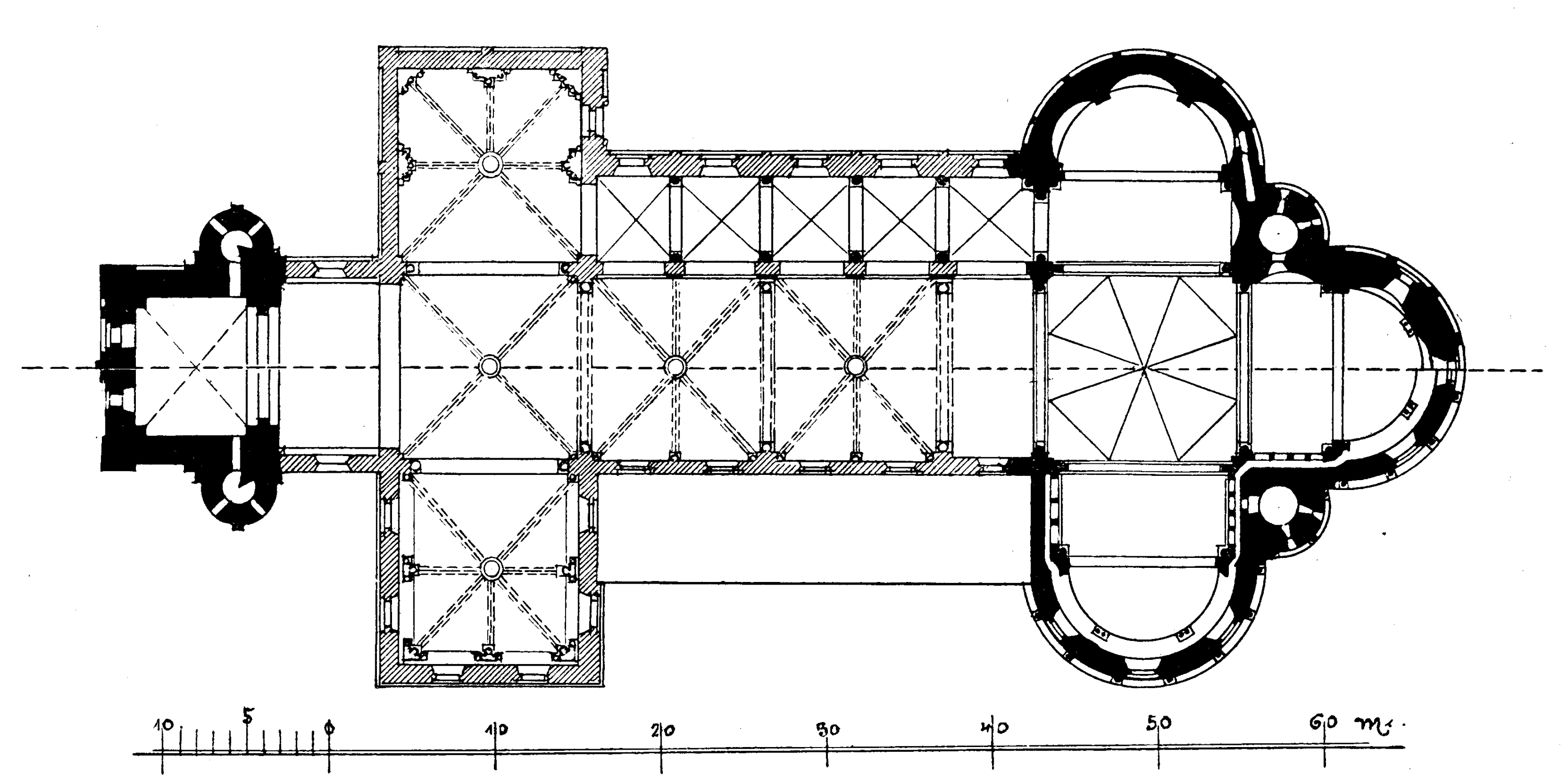
floor plan

The Basilica of the Holy Apostles (German: Basilika St. Aposteln [ˌzaŋkt ʔaˈpɔstl̩n]; Kölsch: Zint Apostele [ˌtsɪ̂nt ʔaˈpɔ̂stəl]) is a Romanesque church in Cologne (Köln), located near Innenstadt's busy Neumarkt (Köln). It is one of the Twelve Romanesque churches of Cologne from that period.

It is historically proven that a monastery was founded here in the 10th century. Its historically secured first Apostle Church was probably a relatively simple building. The former collegiate church is dedicated to the twelve Apostles. Either under Archbishop Heribert, who ruled from 999 to 1021, or subsequently under Archbishop Pilgrim (reign 1021–1036), a large new Salian building was built. Of it are still preserved: large parts of the outer walls of the nave, the western transept and parts of the central nave walls. However, the thin outer skin, the visible wall of these walls, was renewed several times, so that only the core area of these walls still dates from the 11th century.

The church has a basilical plan of nave and aisles, and like Groß St. Martin and St. Maria im Kapitol, has three apses at the east end making a trefoil plan. There is a single tower of 67 metres at the west.

== See also ==
- Twelve Romanesque churches of Cologne
- Cologne Cathedral
- German architecture
- Romanesque architecture
- List of regional characteristics of Romanesque churches
- Romanesque secular and domestic architecture
- High medieval domes

== Literature ==
- Ralf van Bühren: Kunst und Kirche im 20. Jahrhundert. Die Rezeption des Zweiten Vatikanischen Konzils, Paderborn: Verlag Ferdinand Schöningh 2008 (ISBN 978-3-506-76388-4)
- Annerose Berners: St. Aposteln in Köln. Untersuchungen zur Geschichte eines mittelalterlichen Kollegiatstifts bis ins 15. Jahrhundert, 2 Bde., Diss. Bonn 2004
- Sabine Czymmek: Die Kölner romanischen Kirchen, Schatzkunst, Bd. 1, Köln 2008, (ISBN 978-3-7743-0422-2)
- Jörg Poettgen: Das spätgotische Geläute von St. Aposteln. Ein unbekanntes Werk des Kölner Meisters Johan van Andernach. In: Colonia Romanica II (1987)
- Gottfried Stracke: Köln St. Aposteln, Stadtspuren Band 19 – ISBN 3-7616-1035-1
- Norbert Nussbaum: St. Aposteln in Köln – ISBN 3-88094-491-1
