= Neuzeller Kloster Brewery =

German brewing company

Neuzeller Klosterbräu
- Location: Neuzelle, Brandenburg, Germany
- Coordinates: 52°05′26″N 14°39′08″E
- Opened: 1589; 436 years ago
- Key people: Helmut Fritsche
- Annual production volume: 40,000 hectolitres (34,000 US bbl) in 2017
- Employees: 43 in 2017
- Website: klosterbrauerei.com

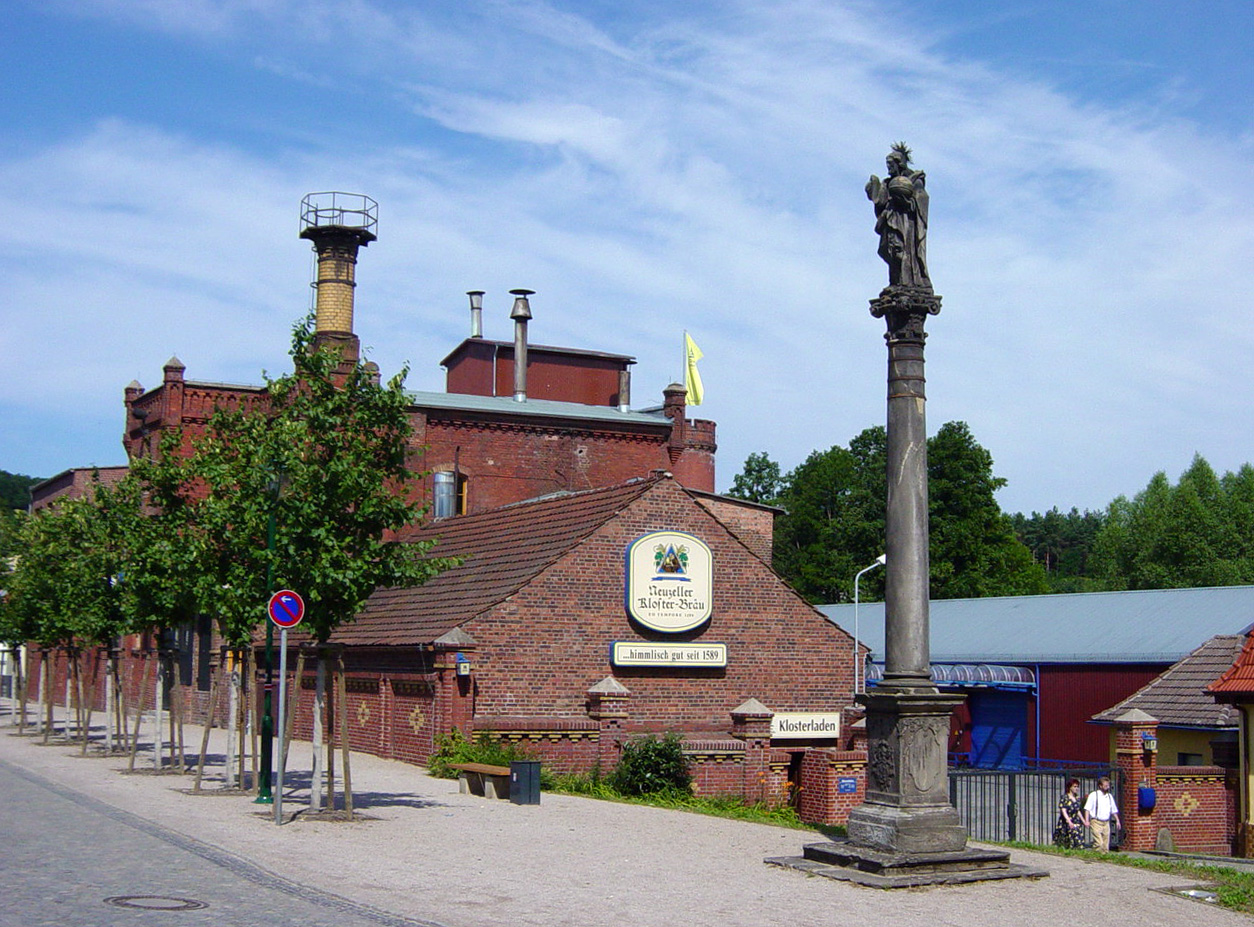
The building of the brewery

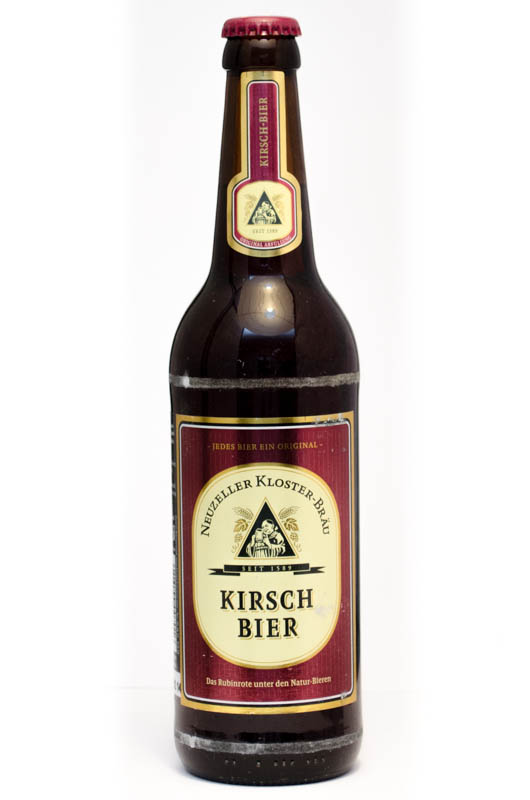
Kirsch Bier

The Neuzelle Cloister Brewery (Neuzeller Klosterbräu) is located in Neuzelle, Germany, and is best known for its Neuzeller "Anti-Aging-Bier".

== History ==
Helmut Fritsche purchased the Neuzeller brewery in 1992, which has been producing beer commercially for over 400 years, and is situated on the grounds of a 12th-century Catholic monastery, Neuzelle Abbey.

The "Anti-Aging-Bier", which, in addition to the four cardinal ingredients of beer, adds spirulina and flavonoids in order to, supposedly, increase health and longevity, was first marketed in February 2004, and claims to have double the anti-oxidant effect of other beers. However, the German Beer Brewers' Association is not entirely willing to label these drinks beers, as their contents differ from those original Reinheitsgebot ingredients.

In 2004, the brewery was ordered to cease production of their product "Schwarzer Abt" or face a $25,000 fine, because the drink contained added sugar syrup it was in conflict with the beer purity law. The brewery had been brewing the dark beer with sugar syrup in East Germany, which had been allowed under East Germany's permissive brewing laws. The brewery had not explicitly labelled it as beer, but as "A Specialty Made From Schwarzbier, With Invert Sugar Syrup Added Afterward". In 2003, the brewery changed the labelling to simply read "Schwarzbier". In 2005, a German court upheld the brewery's challenge to purity laws and allowed the brewery to add sugar syrup to "Schwarzer Abt" and label it as beer, ending the 10 year legal battle.

The brewery also produces a locally successful Schwarzbier, Pilsner, Bock, cherry beer, energy beer, a beer specifically developed for bathing, and a berry-flavored soda used in making a Potsdamer. In 2023, the brewery announced release of a powdered beer.
