= Kreuziger =

Kreutziger is a surname. Notable persons with that name include:

- Christof Kreuziger (born 1948), German rower
- Roman Kreuziger Sr. (born 1965), Czech bicycle racer
- Roman Kreuziger (born 1986), Czech bicycle racer
- Sebastian Kreuziger (born 1991), German motorcycle racer

== See also ==
- Kreuzinger
- Kreutzinger
