= Kreuzinger =

Surname list

Kreuzinger is a surname. Notable people with the surname include:

- Aarne Kreuzinger-Janik (born 1950), German lieutenant general
- Christof Kreuzinger (born 1948), German rower
- Kurt Kreuzinger (1905–1989), German botanist

== See also ==
- Kreutziger
- Kreutzinger
