= Diocese of Görlitz =

Catholic diocese in Germany

Coordinates: 51.1450°N 14.9791°E

Diocese of Görlitz Dioecesis Gorlicensis Bistum Görlitz

Catholic
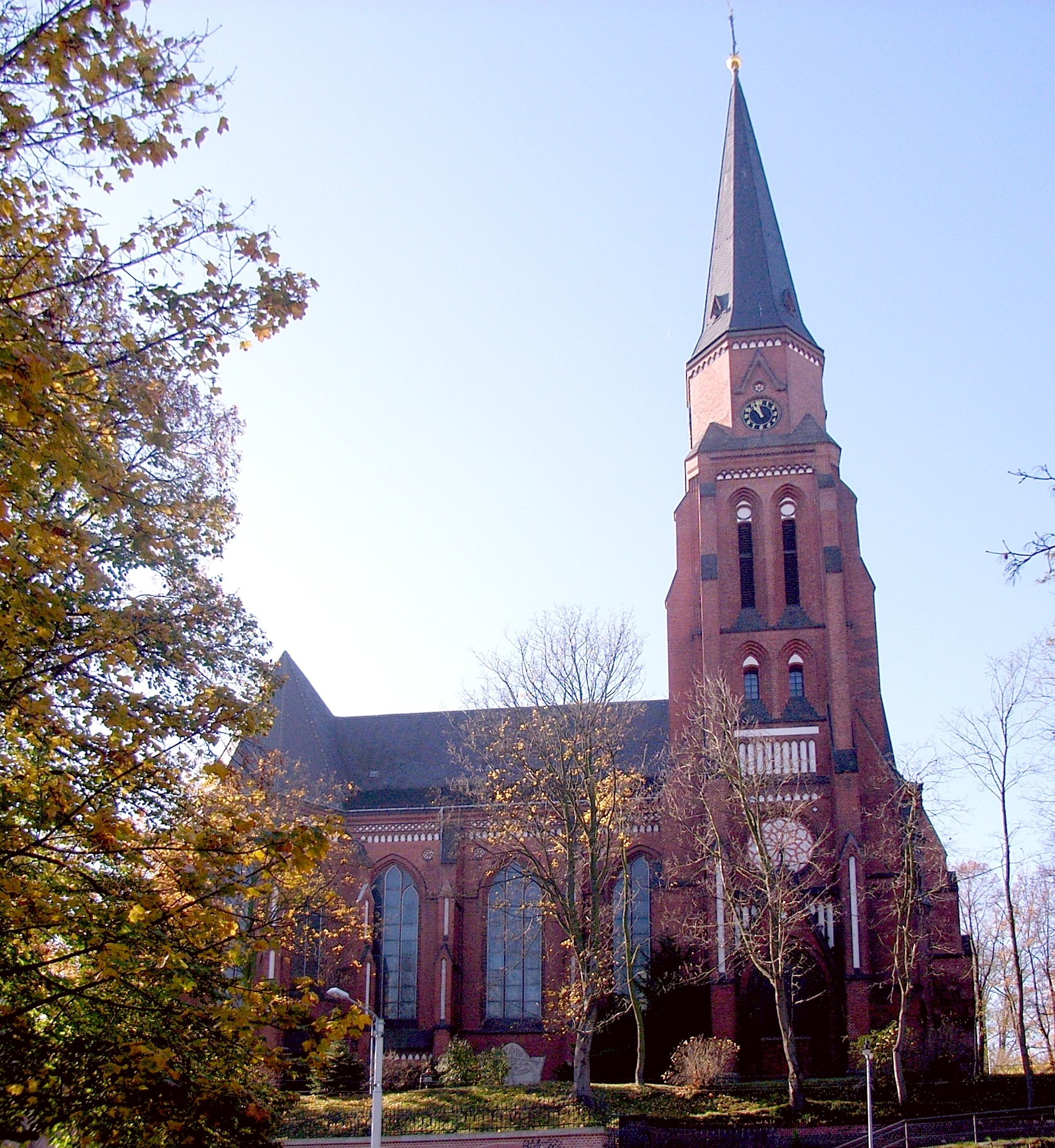
- St. James Cathedral in Görlitz

Location
- Country: Germany
- Ecclesiastical province: Berlin
- Metropolitan: Görlitz, Saxony

Statistics
- Area: 9,700 km^{2} (3,700 sq mi)
- Population: Total; Catholics: (as of 2006); 792,824; 32,203 (4.1%)

Information
- Denomination: Roman Catholic
- Rite: Roman Rite
- Established: June 28, 1972
- Cathedral: St. James Cathedral
- Patron saint: St. Hedwig of Silesia

Current leadership
- Pope: Leo XIV
- Bishop: Wolfgang Ipolt; Bishop of Görlitz
- Metropolitan Archbishop: Heiner Koch
- Bishops emeritus: Rudolf Müller

Map
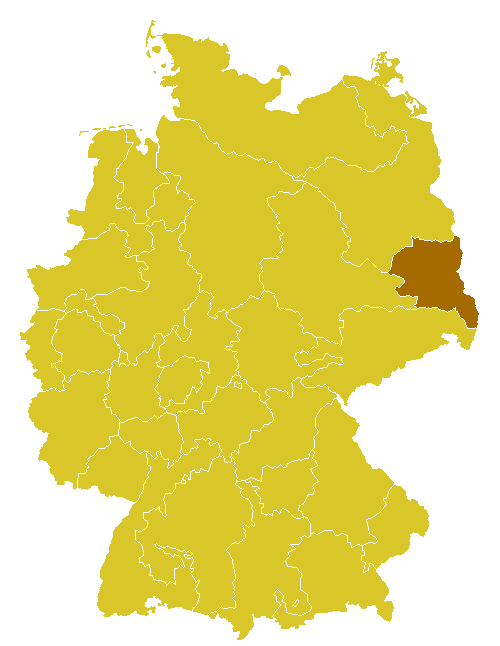

Website
- bistum-goerlitz.de

The Diocese of Görlitz (Latin: Dioecesis Gorlicensis) is a Latin Church diocese of the Catholic church in Germany. The current ordinary is Wolfgang Ipolt.

== History ==
=== As part of the ancient See of Meissen ===
For the history until 1821 see the History of the ancient See of Meissen.

In order to insure the success of the Christian missions among the pagan Wends (a Slavic people), Otto I suggested at the Roman Synod of 962 the creation of an archiepiscopal see at Magdeburg. Pope John XII consented, and shortly before the execution of the plan in 968 it was decided at the Synod of Ravenna (967) to create three bishoprics — Meissen, Merseburg, and Zeitz — as suffragans of the Archdiocese of Magdeburg. The year in which the Diocese of Meissen was established is disputed, as the oldest extant records may be forgeries; however, the record of endowment by Otto I in 971 is considered genuine.

In 1346 the diocese stretched from the Ore Mountains and Iser Mountains in the south, from there northwards downstream the Queis and Bober rivers, forming the eastern boundary, in the north downstream the Oder to the junction of the Lusatian Neisse and on along the Oder, then crossing to the middle course of the Spree in the northwest, thus including Upper Lusatia (then the deanery of Bautzen) and Lower Lusatia (a provostry of the same name).

The chief task of the bishops of the new see was the conversion of the Wends, to which Bishops Volkold (died 992) and Eido (died 1015) devoted themselves with great zeal. Saint Benno (1066–1106), bishop of Meissen, devoted himself to missionary work among the Slavs. In the 13th century the pagan Wends were finally converted to Christianity, chiefly through the efforts of the great Cistercian monasteries, the most important of which were Dobrilugk and Neuzelle.

In 1365 Pope Urban V appointed the Archbishop of Prague legatus natus, or perpetual representative of the Holy See, for the Dioceses of Meissen, of Bamberg and of Regensburg (Ratisbon); the opposition of Magdeburg made it impossible to exercise in Meissen the privileges of this office, and Meissen remained, though under protest, subject to the jurisdiction of the Metropolitan of Magdeburg.

William I, Margrave of Meissen prevailed on Pope Boniface IX in 1405 to free Meissen from the authority of the Magdeburg metropolitan and to place it as an exempt diocese directly under the Holy See. John VII of Schleinitz (1518–1537) was a resolute opponent of Martin Luther, whose revolt began in neighbouring Wittenberg (then part of the Diocese of Brandenburg), and, conjointly with George of Saxony, endeavored to crush the innovations. The canonisation of Benno (1523), urged by him, was intended to offset the progress of the Lutheranism. John VIII of Maltitz (1537–1549) and Nicholas II of Carlowitz (1549–1555) were unable to withstand the ever-spreading Reformation, which after the death of Duke George (1539) triumphed in the Saxon part of the diocese.

The last bishop, John of Haugwitz (1555–1581), placed his resignation in the hands of the cathedral chapter, in virtue of an agreement with Elector Augustus of Saxony, went over to Lutheranism, married and retired to the castle of Ruhetal near Mögeln.

=== As part of the Apostolic Prefecture of Meissen ===
Before his resignation and conversion Haugwitz appointed Johannes Leisentritt as diocesan administrator, seated in Bautzen, competent for the Lusatian areas of the diocese outside of Saxony. Leisentritt failed to win the pope for establishing a new diocese comprising only the Lusatian areas of Meissen diocese. However, in 1567 the Holy See separated the Lusatian areas from the Saxon parts of the diocese and established there the Apostolic Prefecture of Meissen, seated in Bautzen, with Leisentritt as its first prefect. In canon law an apostolic prefecture is a diocese on approval.

According to its location and its seat the prefecture used to be called alternatively the Apostolic Prefecture of the Two Lusatias (Upper and Lower Lusatia) or Apostolic Prefecture of Bautzen. The then liege lord of the Two Lusatias, the Catholic king of Bohemia (in personal union Holy Roman Emperor) did not effectively offend the spreading of the Reformation in the Two Lusatias. So it depended on the local vassals if Protestantism prevailed or not. When in 1635 the Lutheran Electorate of Saxony annexed the Two Lusatias it guaranteed in the cession contract (Traditionsrezess) with Bohemia to leave the existing religious relations untouched. As a signatory of the Peace of Westphalia of 1648 Saxony later agreed to maintain the religious status quo as given in the reference year of 1624 in all its territories acquired since.

After the Prussian annexation of Lower Lusatia and eastern Upper Lusatia in 1815 the Holy See assigned the Lower Lusatian and eastern Upper Lusatian areas of the Meissen prefectureto the Prussian Prince-Bishopric of Breslau (Wrocław) in 1821 (Bull De salute animarum). The remaining prefecture, which had maintained a strong Catholic identity, used to be also called since the Apostolic Prefecture of (Saxon) Upper Lusatia.

=== As part of the See of Breslau/Wrocław ===
For the history between 1821 and 1972 see the History of the See of Wrocław.

The Bull De salute animarum disentangled Breslau diocese from Gniezno ecclesiastical province and made Breslau an exempt bishopric. The bull also reconfined the Breslau diocesan area, adding the Prussian-annexed parts of the Apostolic Prefecture of Meissen in Lower Lusatia (politically part of Prussian Brandenburg since 1815) and eastern Upper Lusatia (to Prussian Silesia as of 1815).

Prince-Bishop Emmanuel von Schimonsky combatted the rationalistic tendencies which were rife among his clergy in regard to celibacy and the use of Latin in the church services and ceremonies. During the episcopate of his predecessor the government had promulgated a law which was a source of much trouble to Schimonsky and his immediate successors; this was that in those places where Catholics were few in number, the parish should be declared extinct, and the church buildings given to the newly founded Evangelical Church in Prussia. In spite of the protests of the episcopal authorities, over one hundred church buildings were lost in this way, among them the Holy Cross Church in Neuzelle. King Frederick William III of Prussia put an end to this injustice, and sought to make good the injuries inflicted.

Freiherr Melchior von Diepenbrock's (1845–1853) episcopate was the beginning of a new religious and ecclesiastical life in the diocese. During the revolutionary period the prince-bishop not only maintained order in his see, which was in a state of ferment, but was also a supporter of the government. He received unusual honours from the king and was made a cardinal by the Pope. He died 20 January 1853, at Johannisberg (Jánský Vrch) Castle, in the Austrian Silesian part of the diocese, and was buried in the Wrocław Cathedral.

His successor, Heinrich Förster (1853–1881), carried on his work and completed it. Prince-Bishop Förster gave generous aid to the founding of churches, monastic institutions, and schools. The strife that arose between the Church and the State brought his labours in the Prussian part of his diocese to an end. He was deposed by the State and was obliged to leave Breslau and retire to the episcopal Johannisberg Castle in Austrian Silesia where he died, 20 October 1881; he was buried in the cathedral at Breslau.

Pope Leo XIII appointed as his successor in the disordered diocese Robert Herzog (1882–1886), who had been before the Prince-Episcopal Delegate for Brandenburg and Pomerania and provost of St. Hedwig's in Berlin. Prince-Bishop Herzog made every endeavour to bring order out of the confusion into which the quarrel with the State during the immediately preceding years had thrown the affairs of the diocese. Unfortunately, his episcopate was very short. The Holy See then appointed Georg Kopp who had done much to allay the strife between Church and State.

According to the census of 1 December 1905, the German part of the Breslau diocesan area, including the prince-episcopal delegation, comprised 3,342,221 Catholics; 8,737,746 Protestants; and 204,749 Jews. It was the richest German diocese by revenues and offertories. There were actively employed in the diocese 1,632 secular, and 121 regular, priests. The cathedral chapter included the two offices of provost and dean, and had 10 regular, and 6 honorary, canons.

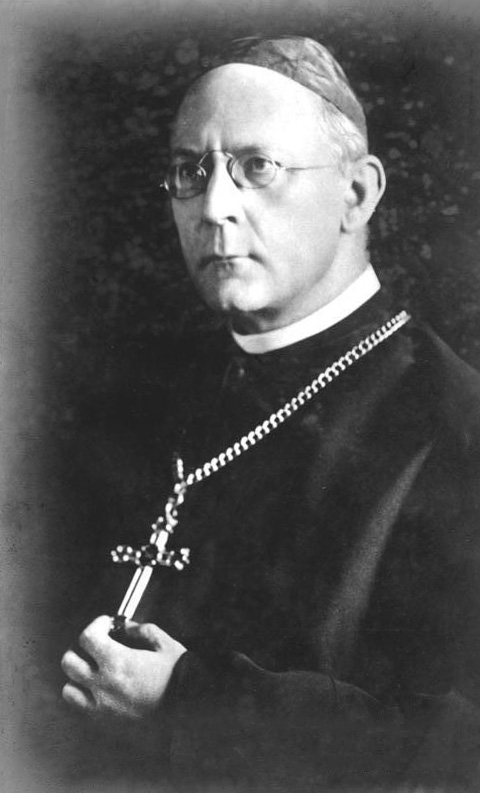
Cardinal Adolf Bertram, elevated to first Archbishop of Breslau in 1930.

The restitution of Poland also brought changes in ecclesiastical respect. The Catholic parishes in East Upper Silesia and the Polish part of Cieszyn/Těšín Silesia were disentangled from Breslau on 7 November 1922. Whereas the sees of Breslau, of Hradec Králové and of Olomouc continued as Czechoslovak-German cross-border dioceses.

According to the Prussian Concordat of 1929 the prior exempt See of Breslau was elevated to the rank of archdiocese in 1930, then supervising the Eastern German Ecclesiastical Province comprising Breslau proper and as suffragans the new diocese of Berlin, formerly exempt Diocese of Ermland (Warmia) and the new Prelature of Schneidemühl (Piła). Cardinal Adolf Bertram (1859–1945), bishop since 1914 was elevated to archbishop.

After World War II, in May 1945, the city of Breslau became again part of Poland under its historic Polish name Wrocław. On 21 June 1945 Bertram, while staying in the episcopal Jánský Vrch Castle in Czechoslovak Javorník, appointed František Onderek (1888–1962) as vicar general for the Czechoslovak part of the archdiocese. On 6 July 1945 Bertram died on Jánský Vrch Castle. On 16 July the archdiocesan cathedral chapter, still comprising nine members, elected the Polish-speaking Ferdinand Piontek as capitular vicar, whom the Gestapo had banned from Breslau in early February 1945. On his return to the town he was sworn in by the chapter on 23 July. On 12 August 1945 Cardinal August Hlond appeared and demanded Piontek to resign from his office for the archdiocesan territory east of the Oder-Neisse line, claiming to act on the authority of papal mandates, however, only applying to the pre-war territory of Poland.

So Piontek – not knowing of the restricted mandate – resigned for the Polish-held parts of the archdiocese, but not for the remaining parts in Czechoslovakia and Allied-occupied Germany. On 15 August Hlond appointed three apostolic administrators for the Polish part of Wrocław archdiocese, with effect of 1 September. Capitular Vicar Piontek confirmed Onderek on 18 August 1945 als vicar general for the Czechoslovak part of the archdiocese. Piontek was asked to help Karol Milik, the new administrator in Wrocław, and stayed. He could also take care of the Catholic clergy and laymen of German language, who were in the course of expulsion in accordance to the Potsdam Agreement by the Soviet-installed communist authorities.

Pope Pius XII did not recognise Hlond's overbearance. In order to strengthen Piontek's position Pius XII granted him the rights of a residing bishop on 28 February 1946. However, on 9 July the Polish authorities expelled Piontek and he stranded in Peine, then the British zone of occupation. On 31 July Pius XII confirmed Onderek's appointment and advanced him to Apostolic Administrator of the Czechoslovak part of the Archdiocese of Breslau (Czech: Apoštolská administratura českotěšínská), seated in Český Těšín, thus definitely divesting it from Breslau's jurisdiction. The Archdiocese of Breslau remained in existence de jure, however, de facto this only applied to the archdiocesan territory in the Soviet Occupation zone of Germany. This also included big parts of the suffragan diocese of Berlin in the Soviet zone including the Allied-occupied city of Berlin, but not Berlin's diocesan areas east of the Oder-Neisse line.

In 1947 Piontek returned to the Soviet occupied archdiocesan territory west of the Oder-Neisse line and officiated as capitular vicar at the local branch of the archdiocesan ordinariate in Silesian Görlitz, built up since October 1945. Despite the anticlerical Soviet policy he managed to build up a new seminary in Neuzelle in 1948, after the old seminary in Poland was inaccessible for candidates from west of the new border. In 1949 Piontek's range of jurisdiction west of the Oder-Neisse line became part of East Germany. In 1953 Pius XII invested Piontek with the right to bear a crosier and bestow episcopal blessings. On 23 May 1959 Piontek became titular bishop of Barca.

The Holy See refused to acknowledge Polish Catholic Church claims to Wrocław, however, and only appointed for the Polish archdiocesan area auxiliary bishops to the Archdiocese of Kraków in order to serve the Poles, who remained in Silesia and those who settled in the region. Legally the archdiocese was still considered part of the Fulda Conference of Catholic Bishops inside Germany of the borders of 31 December 1937.

=== Apostolic Administration of Görlitz ===
On 28 June 1972, however, – in response to West Germany's change in Ostpolitik – Pope Paul VI redrew the archdiocesan boundary along the post-war borders. The Apostolic constitution Vratislaviensis – Berolinensis et aliarum disentangled the East German archdiocesan territory becoming the exempt new Apostolic Administration of Görlitz. Breslau's German suffragan the Berlin diocese became exempt.

On 27 June 1994 Pope John Paul II elevated the apostolic administration to the rank of a diocese, a suffragan to the newly elevated Archdiocese of Berlin. By his Apostolic exhortation Semper studuit John Paul II confirmed Wrocław's traditional Saint Hedwig of Silesia as diocesan patron saint.

== Territory and membership ==
Görlitz's territory covers the northeast of today's Saxony and the southeast of today's Brandenburg (Lower Lusatia). Comprising prevalently Protestant parts of a former large diocese, the Diocese of Görlitz is by far the smallest German diocese in terms of Catholic membership, thinly dispersed over the territory except for Wittichenau (Kulow).

== Institutions ==
In 1948 Ferdinand Piontek, then capitular vicar at the local branch of Breslau's archdiocesan ordinariate in Görlitz, opened the seminary Bernardinum in Neuzelle. It was merged with that in Erfurt in 1993 and its Neuzelle premises were later closed. Its library of more than 30,000 volumes was donated to the seminary of the Diocese of Legnica in 2000.

== Ordinaries ==
- Ferdinand Piontek (1945–1963)
- Bernhard Huhn (1972–1994)
- Rudolf Müller (1994–2006)
- Konrad Zdarsa (2007–2010)
- Wolfgang Ipolt (2011– )
