= Bertram Meier =

Bishop of Augsburg from 2020 to Present

- Bishop of Augsburg
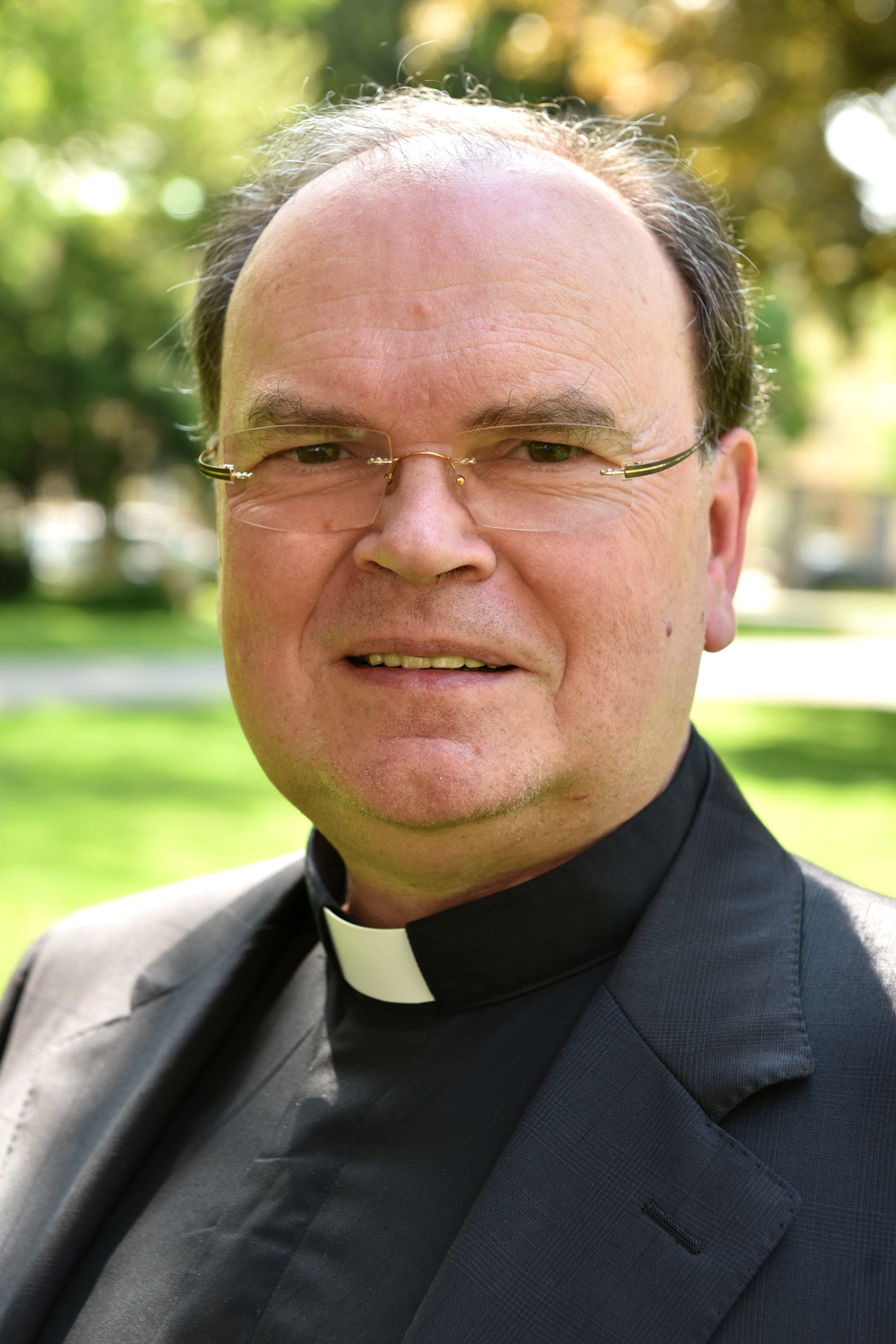
- Church: Roman Catholic
- Diocese: Augsburg
- Appointed: 29 January 2020
- Installed: 6 June 2020
- Term ended: Present
- Predecessor: Konrad Zdarsa
- Successor: Incumbent

Orders
- Ordination: 10 October 1985 by Franz König
- Consecration: 6 June 2020 by Reinhard Marx, Nikola Eterović, Ludwig Schick

Personal details
- Born: 20 July 1960 (age 65) Buchloe, Germany
- Coat of arms

Bertram Meier (born 20 July 1960 in Buchloe, Bavaria) is a German prelate of the Roman Catholic Church. He served as bishop of Augsburg since 2020.

== Life ==
Meier studied Roman Catholic theology at the University of Augsburg and in Rome at Pontifical Gregorian University. He was ordained as priest on 10 October 1985. On 29 January 2020, he was appointed bishop of Augsburg and consecrated bishop on 6 June of the same year.

== Notes and references ==
Catholic Church titles
Preceded by Konrad Zdarsa	Bishop of Augsburg; 2020 – Present	Succeeded by Incumbent
