= Rudolf Müller =

Rudolf Müller may refer to:

- Rudolf Müller (bishop), German Roman Catholic bishop
- Rudolf Müller (pilot), German pilot
