= Konrad Zdarsa =

Bishop of Augsburg from 2010 to 2019

- Bishop of Augsburg
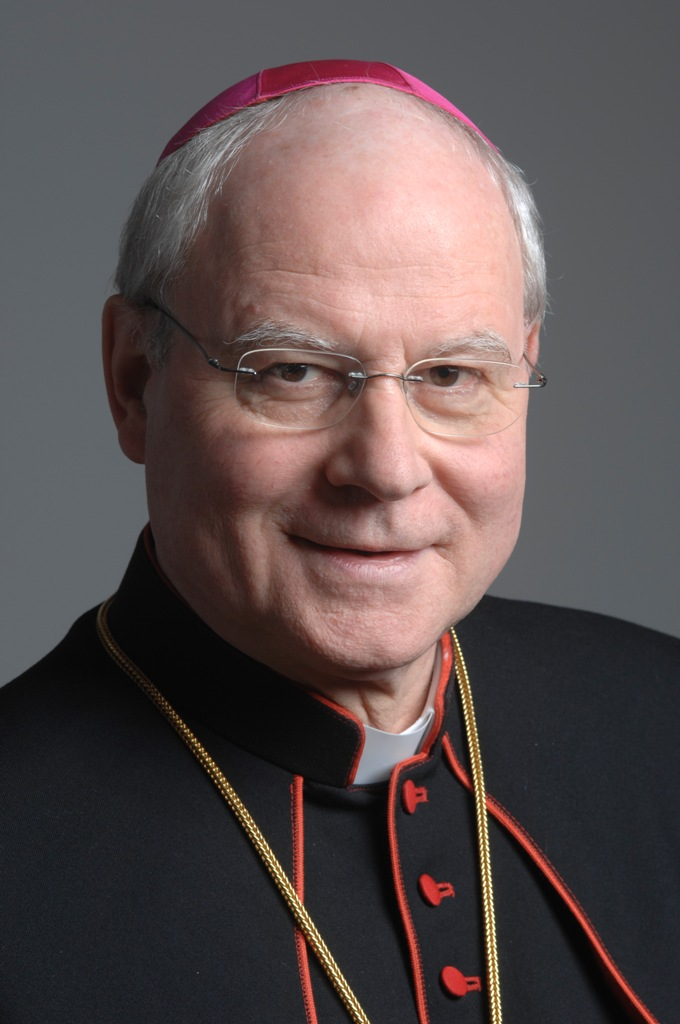
- Konrad Zdarsa (2007)
- Church: Catholic Church
- Diocese: Augsburg
- Appointed: 8 July 2010
- Installed: 23 October 2010
- Term ended: 4 July 2019
- Predecessor: Walter Mixa
- Successor: Bertram Meier
- Other post: Bishop of Görlitz

Orders
- Ordination: 16 March 1974 by Gerhard Schaffran
- Consecration: 23 June 2007 by Cardinal Georg Sterzinsky

Personal details
- Born: 7 June 1944 (age 81) Hainichen, Saxony, Germany

Konrad Zdarsa (born 7 June 1944) is a prelate of the Catholic Church. He served as bishop of Görlitz from 2007 till 2010, when he became bishop of Augsburg. He retired from the Augsburg see on 4 July 2019.

== Family Origins ==
Konrad Zdarsa was born on 7 June 1944, in the village of Hainichen in central Saxony. He was the seventh child of Austrian Johann Zdarsa and Bavarian Elisabeth Zdarsa (née Goppel). Konrad Zdarsa held Austrian citizenship based on his father's nationality and was able to travel abroad without restrictions even from communist East Germany.

His late maternal uncle Alfons Goppel (1905–1991), was a German politician in the CSU Party and Bavarian Prime Minister from 1962 to 1978. His cousin, Thomas Goppel is a German politician in the CSU.

== Life ==
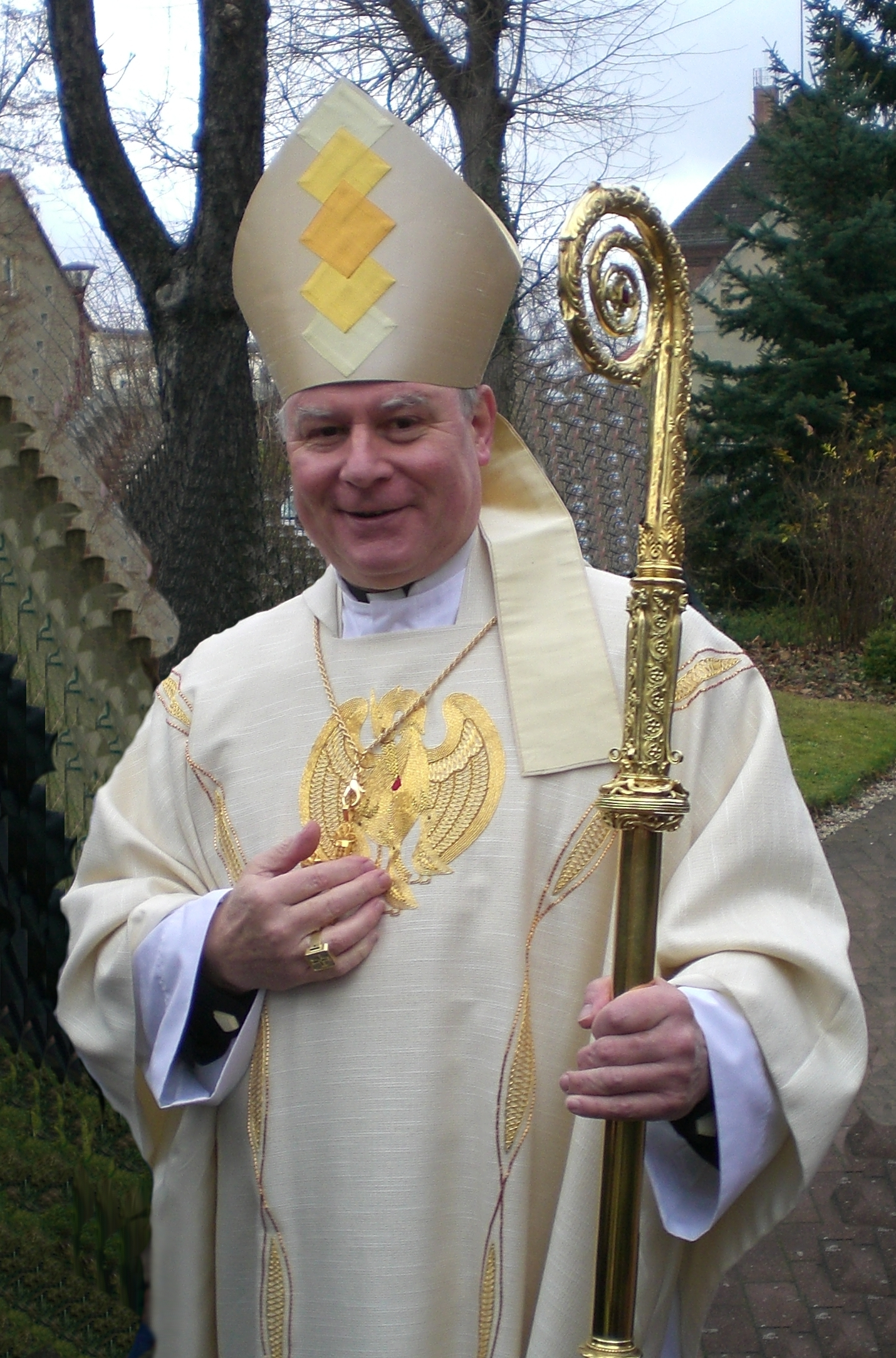
As bishop of Görlitz (2007)

After finishing tenth grade, Zdarsa was initially prohibited from higher education and instead trained vocationally as a machinist in a factory in Hainichen. Later, after he was able to sit for his Abitur, Zdarsa studied catholic theology and philosophy at the seminary of Erfurt.

On 16 March 1974 in Dresden, Zdarsa was ordained to the priesthood by Bishop Gerhard Schaffran, and he served afterward in the church of St. Franziskus Xaverius in Dresden. In 1976 he was elevated to vicar of the dome, episcopal secretary, and chair of the diocesan curia. In 1977 Zdarsa began doctoral studies at the Pontifical Gregorian University, where he finished his dissertation in canon law in 1982 earning the title of Doctor iuris canonici. In 1985 Zdarsa received the title of "defender of the Bond" in his home diocese. In 2004 he was elevated to vicar general in Dresden-Meißen.

== Bishop ==
On 24 April 2007, he was appointed bishop of Görlitz. Zdarsa received his episcopal consecration on the following 23 June from Cardinal Georg Sterzinsky, archbishop of Berlin, with the Bishop of Dresden-Meissen, Joachim Friedrich Reinelt, and the former bishop of Görlitz, Rudolf Müller, serving as co-consecrators.

On 8 July 2010, he was appointed bishop of Augsburg, where he was installed on the following 23 October.

Pope Francis accepted his resignation on 4 July 2019.

== Coat of arms ==
Zdarsas Coat of Arms (2009)

Konrad Zdarsa took over his coat of arms from his time in Görlitz as bishop of Augsburg. His motto is: "Ipse enim est pax nostra" ("He is our peace") Epistle to the Ephesians (2,14). The colours green and blue in the coat of arms are showing the origin from Saxony and Styria, as well as Bavaria. The emblems are a dove of Peace (his hometown Hainichen), Benno of Meissen and Jacob (as a sign of the diocese, where he became bishop).

== Notes and references ==
Catholic Church titles
Preceded by Walter Mixa	Bishop of Augsburg; 2010 – 2019	Succeeded by Bertram Meier
