= János Donát =

German painter (1744–1830)

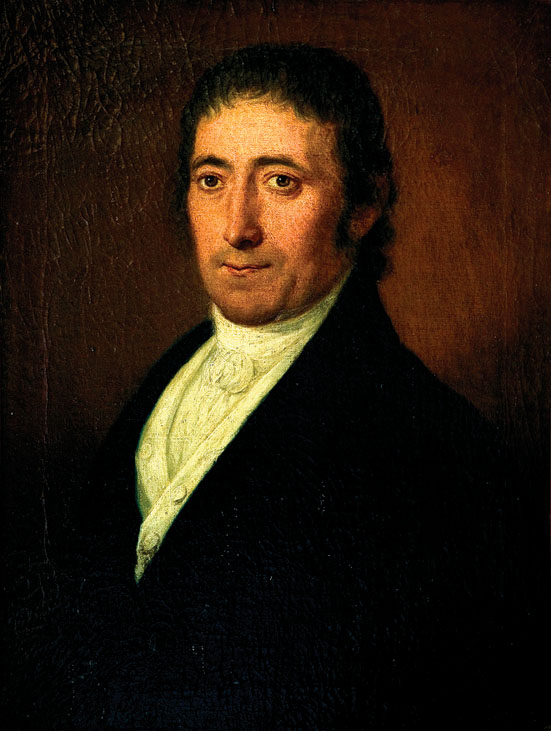
- Self-portrait
- Born: Johann Daniel Donat; 22 December 1744; Neuzelle, Margraviate of Brandenburg, Kingdom of Prussia
- Died: 11 May 1830 (aged 85); Pest, Kingdom of Hungary
- Education: Academy of Fine Arts Vienna
- Known for: Painting
- Movement: Classicism
- Spouses: Theresia Rössler (died 1802) Susanna Rieger (m. 1809)

János Donát (born as Johann Daniel Donat; 22 December 1744 – 11 May 1830) was a German-born Hungarian painter.

== Life ==
=== Early life ===
János Donát was born as Johann Daniel Donat in Neuzelle, in the Margraviate of Brandenburg of the Kingdom of Prussia (today Germany) on 22 December 1744. He did his elementary and secondary studies in Prague, Bohemia. Then he went to Marienstern Abbey (today in Mühlberg, Germany) where he learnt to draw.

=== Life in Vienna (1766–1795) ===
In 1766 at the age of 22 he applied to study at the Academy of Fine Arts Vienna where his masters were Johann Christian Brand, Joseph Kreutzinger, Martin van Meytens, Caspar Franz Sambach, Josef Fischer and Franz Edmund Weirotter and he received a qualification for historical painting of portraits and landscapes. He was at that time already so talented that Weirotter exhibited two of his pictures in the Redouten Saale in the royal palace, the Hofburg.

After finishing his studies he settled in Vienna. As a young painter he became surprisingly successful. His earliest works were three paintings for the Austrian Mint, several life-sized portraits of the royal pair and aristocrats and also some paintings with religious thematic. Unfortunately the most are unknown, but one of them, a life-size portrait of Joseph II from 1781 can be currently found in the collection of the Louvre Museum. His oldest known painting is from 1774 of an unknown nobleman and it is today in Ptuj Castle (Ptuj, Slovenia). The positioning of the model, a slightly pivoting strain and the light-shadow play on the face are all following the traditions of the Baroque portrait painting. Four years later, in 1778, was the portrait of Maria Theresa in mourning dress completed. It shows the empress, unlike the representative Baroque royal portraits, in natural environment without emperor symbols. She sits with a classicist vase and a little Putto-sculpture in her decorated garden on a stone bank heading to the viewers. A typical work of the Enlightenment, free from the Baroque motions and emotions. Reserved residence characterizes her. It is a typical topic in the era after the death of her husband, Francis I.

In 1779, the city of Teschen (today Cieszyn, Poland) asked him to depict the seven ambassadors of the peace conference closing the Silesian Wars. These paintings are in the Muzeum Śląska Cieszyńskiego in Cieszyn. His next important works were the portrait of Putnik Karloviczi Greek metropolitan from 1782, the portrait of the young Moritz, Prince of Dietrichstein from 1788.

=== Pest ===
After moving to Pest in 1810 he painted some of his most noted classicist portraits such as Ferenc Kazinczy in 1812 and Benedek Virág in 1815.

He was also noted for his compositions such as Resting Venus, Orfeus and Euridike, and Proserpina which were paintings of mythological creatures painted after English copper engravings.

He died in Pest on 11 May 1830.

== Personal life ==
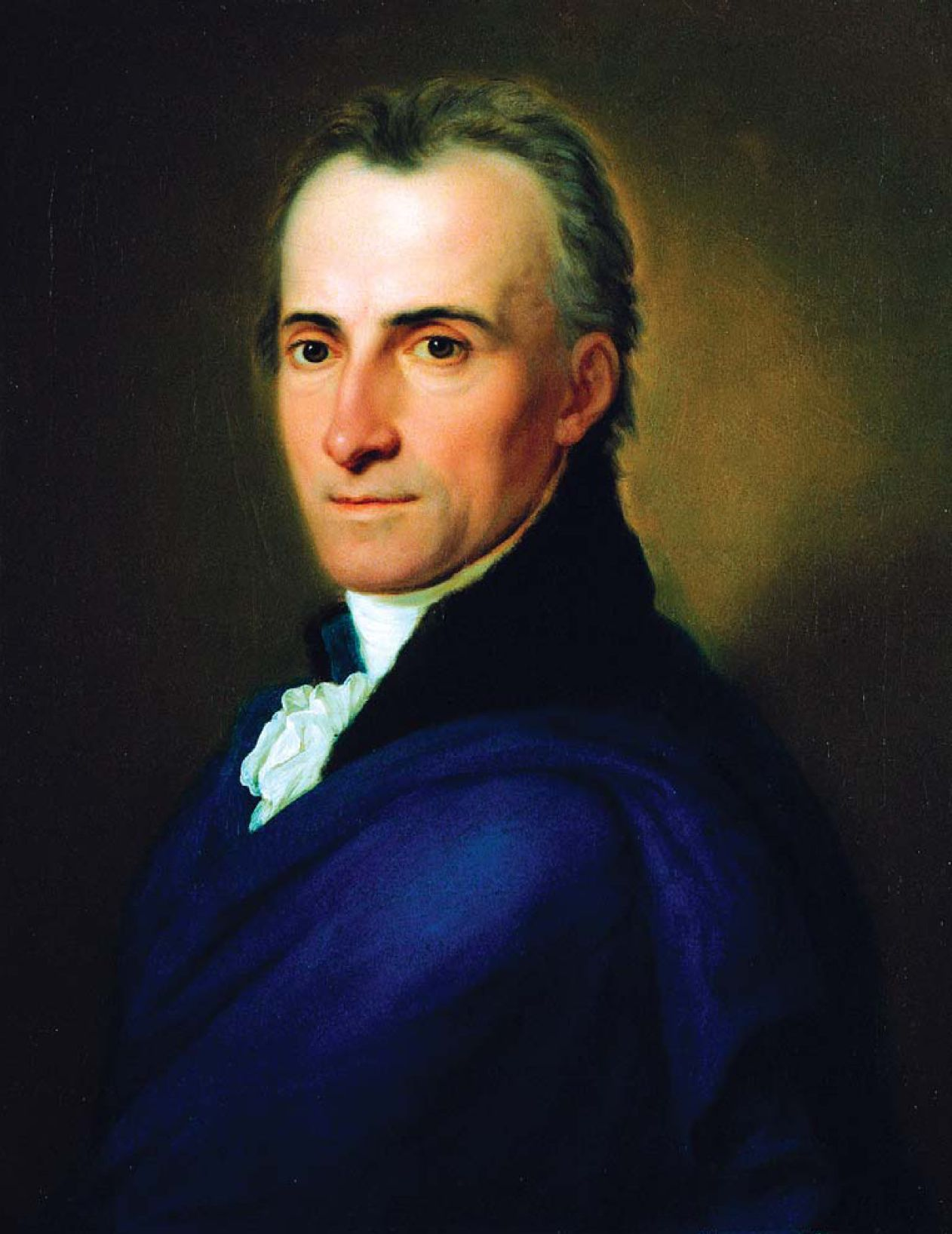
János Donát and Ferenc Kazinczy were friends. Kazinczy asked him to copy Joseph Kreutzinger's portrait of him. The work was finished in 1812.

Ferenc Kazinczy was a good friend of Donát's. They corresponded in Hungarian.

Donát's first wife was Theresia Rössler (1745–1802). In 1809 Donát married Susanna Rieger (30 August 1784 – 27 September 1849), a mulatto 40 years younger than him. Kazinczy called her Marie in his letters to Donát. According to Kazinczy, she was the illegitimate daughter of Carl, the prince of Lichtenstein.

== Literature ==
- Zsuzsanna Bakó - Donát János festő munkássága
