= St. Jakobus, Görlitz =

The Cathedral of St James
- Görlitz Dom
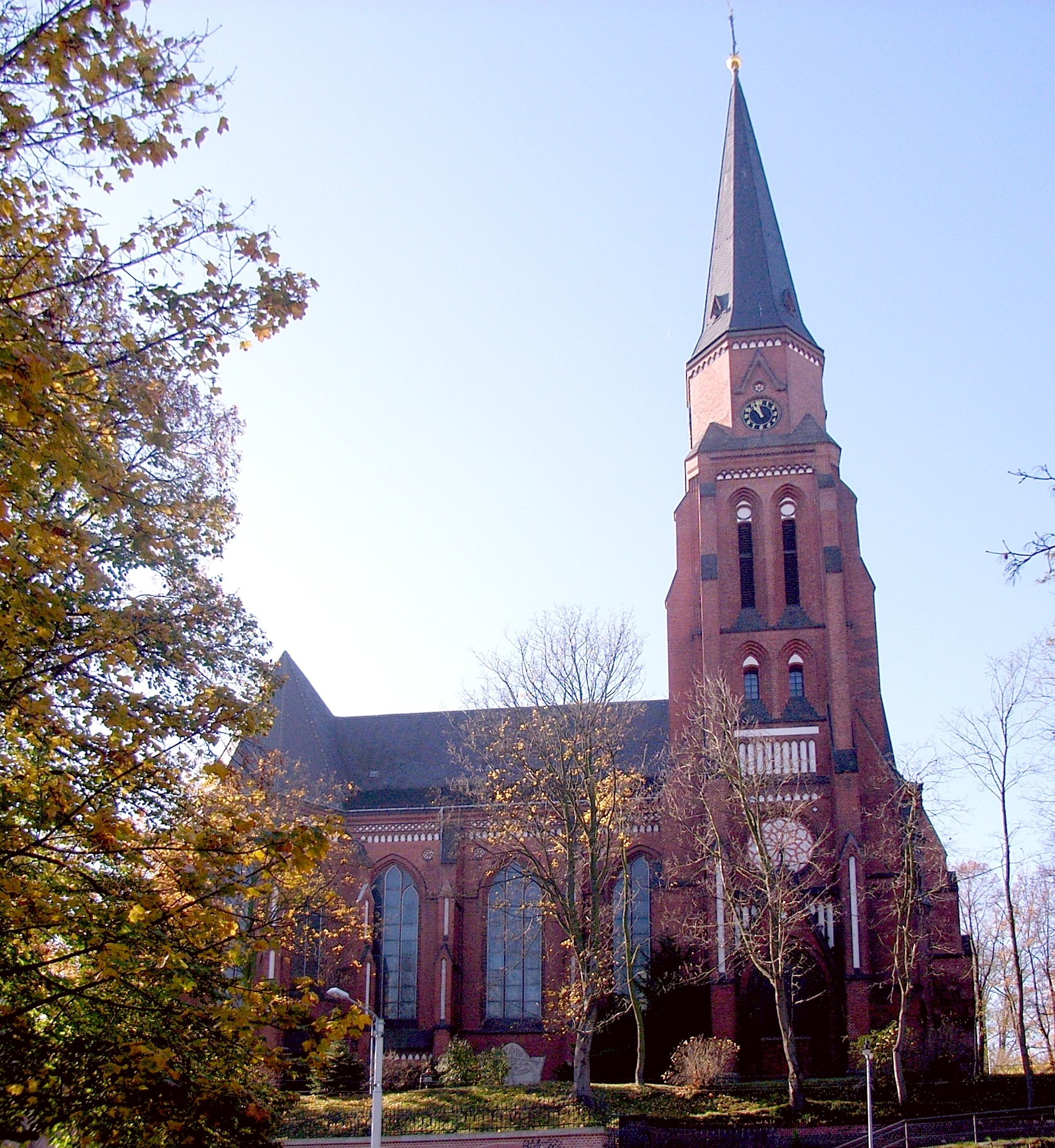

- Location within Saxony Location within Germany
- 51°08′42″N 14°58′46″E
- Location: Görlitz
- Country: Germany
- Denomination: Roman Catholic

History
- Status: Active
- Founded: 1898
- Consecrated: 6 October 1900

Architecture
- Functional status: Cathedral and Parish Church
- Style: Neo-Gothic

Administration
- Diocese: Diocese of Görlitz

Clergy
- Bishop: Wolfgang Ipolt

The cathedral of St. Jakobus (St. James) in Görlitz, Germany, is the cathedral of the Roman Catholic Diocese of Görlitz, dedicated to St. James. It was built in neo-Gothic style and consecrated in 1900 as a parish church. It became a cathedral in 1994, due to the reorganisation of East German dioceses.

== History ==
The church was built in the years 1898 to 1900 and consecrated on 6 October 1900. Görlitz was then part of the Roman Catholic Diocese of Breslau (elevated to Metropolia in 1930 and renamed Wrocław in 1972). It was originally planned to be the second church of the parish Hl. Kreuz (Holy Cross). Bishop Adolf Bertram made it the church of the new parish of St. Jakobus in 1918.

In March 1947, in result of World War II, Görlitz served as the exile seat of the Breslau Metropolitan Chapter headed by Vicar Capitular Ferdinand Piontek, whom the Polish authorities had expelled from Wrocław (Breslau) on 9 July 1946 to the British zone of occupation, but who in 1947 managed to return to the western part of the archdiocese then in the Soviet Occupation zone of Germany. Since October 1945 the Breslau archdiocesan ordinariate ran a branch office in Görlitz, first responsible for the Soviet zone archdiocesan territory, which became the head office (Erzbischöfliches Amt, i.e. Archdiocesan Office) after the chapter and other administrative staff had been expelled from Wrocław.

The Archdiocese of Breslau remained in existence de jure, however, de facto this only applied to the archdiocesan territory in the Soviet Zone, which remained represented by Piontek at the Fulda Conference of Bishops. While the Polish-annexed greater part of the Breslau archdiocese came under the jurisdiction of Apostolic Administrators first appointed by August Hlond (as of 1 September 1945), the Czechoslovak part of Breslau archdiocese became a separate Apostolic Administration of Český Těšín in 1947. St. James was the cathedral for the Breslau archdiocesan territory in the Soviet Zone, which became the East German Democratic Republic in 1949.

With the Holy See's dissolution of Breslau's Eastern German Ecclesiastical Province and the reorganisation of the archdiocese and its suffragans in 1972 (cf. Apostolic constitution Vratislaviensis – Berolinensis et aliarum), the Polish bulk of Breslau's archdiocesan area became the Archdiocese of Wrocław, whereas the East German part of Breslau archdiocese was disentangled from the archdiocese and made the exempt Apostolic Administration of Görlitz with St. James converted to procathedral (as of 1972). By the reorganisation of the dioceses in Northern and Middle Germany in the early 1990s the Görlitz Apostolic Administration was upgraded to diocese in 1994 and St. James became its cathedral. It also serves as the parish church for the St. Jakobus congregation.

== Architecture ==
The neo-Gothic hall church in brick construction with the 68-foot tower stands on a hill and is therefore visible from afar. During the last days of World War II, the church was badly damaged by artillery fire. It was restored, with a simplified structure of the spire without spire lights. Only fragments of the original wall paintings and ornamental glazed tiles survived. Restoration of the four small side towers, the roof structures and the frieze from yellow and red tiles was planned to be completed in 2012.

== Features ==
=== Bells ===
The four bells are named after St. James, St. Benedict, St. Mary and St. Boniface. After the destruction during World War II, steel yokes were erected in 1963. When they showed fatigue cracks three of the bells were temporarily stopped. All bells have been put back into service after restoration in July 2012.

=== Organ ===
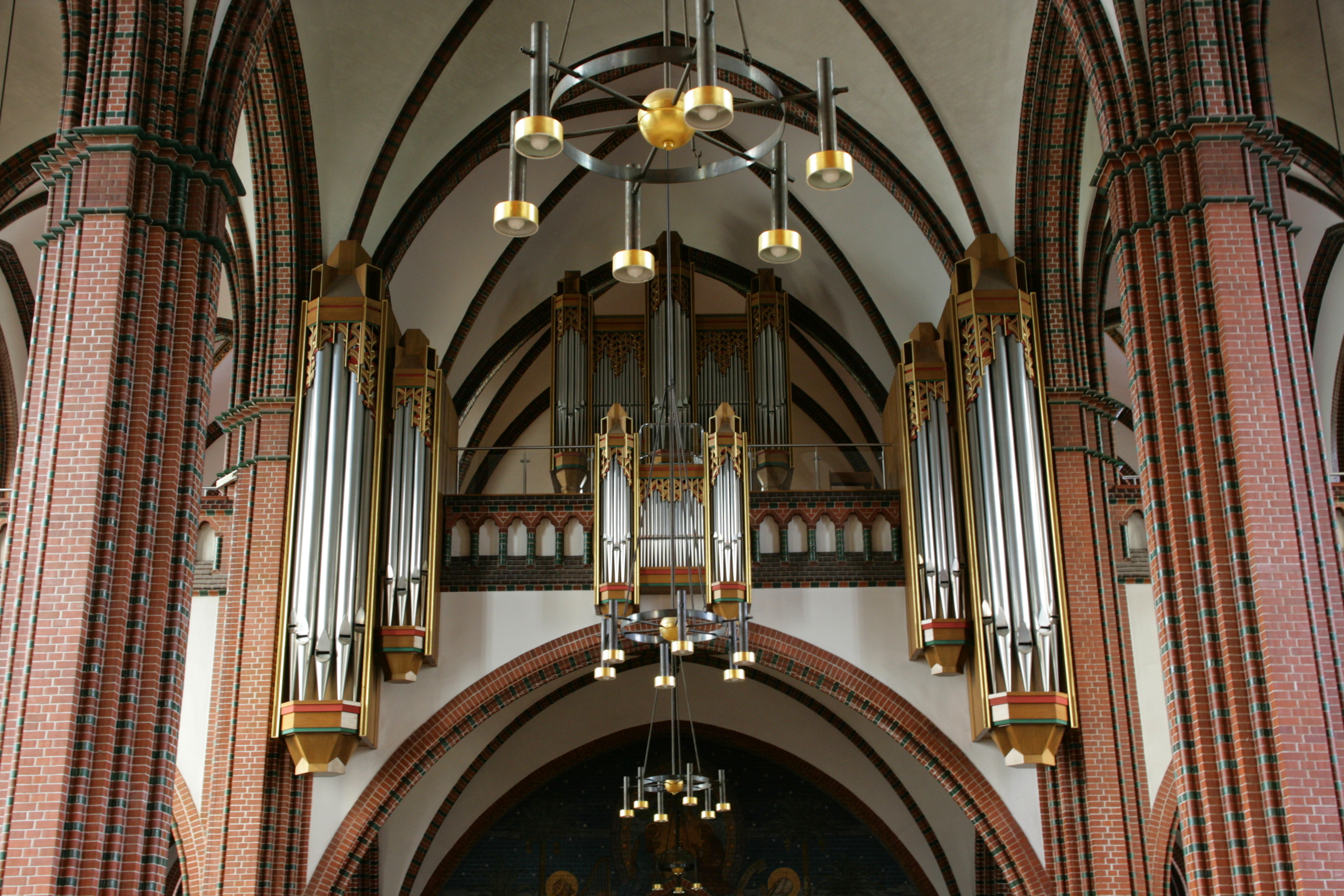
St. Jakobus Cathedral

The organ was built from 1988 to 1989 by Hermann Eule Orgelbau Bautzen with three manuals and 47 registers. It has mechanical sound action and electric stop action.
