= Szydłów, Lubusz Voivodeship =

Szydłów
- Village
- Location within Poland
- Coordinates: 52°04′25″N 14°45′45″E
- Country: Poland
- Voivodeship: Lubusz
- County: Słubice
- Gmina: Cybinka

Population
  - Total: 0
- Time zone: UTC+1 (CET)
  - Summer (DST): UTC+2 (CEST)

Szydłów ([ˈʂɨdwuf]) is an abandoned village in the administrative district of Gmina Cybinka, within Słubice County, Lubusz Voivodeship, in western Poland, close to the German border.

== History ==
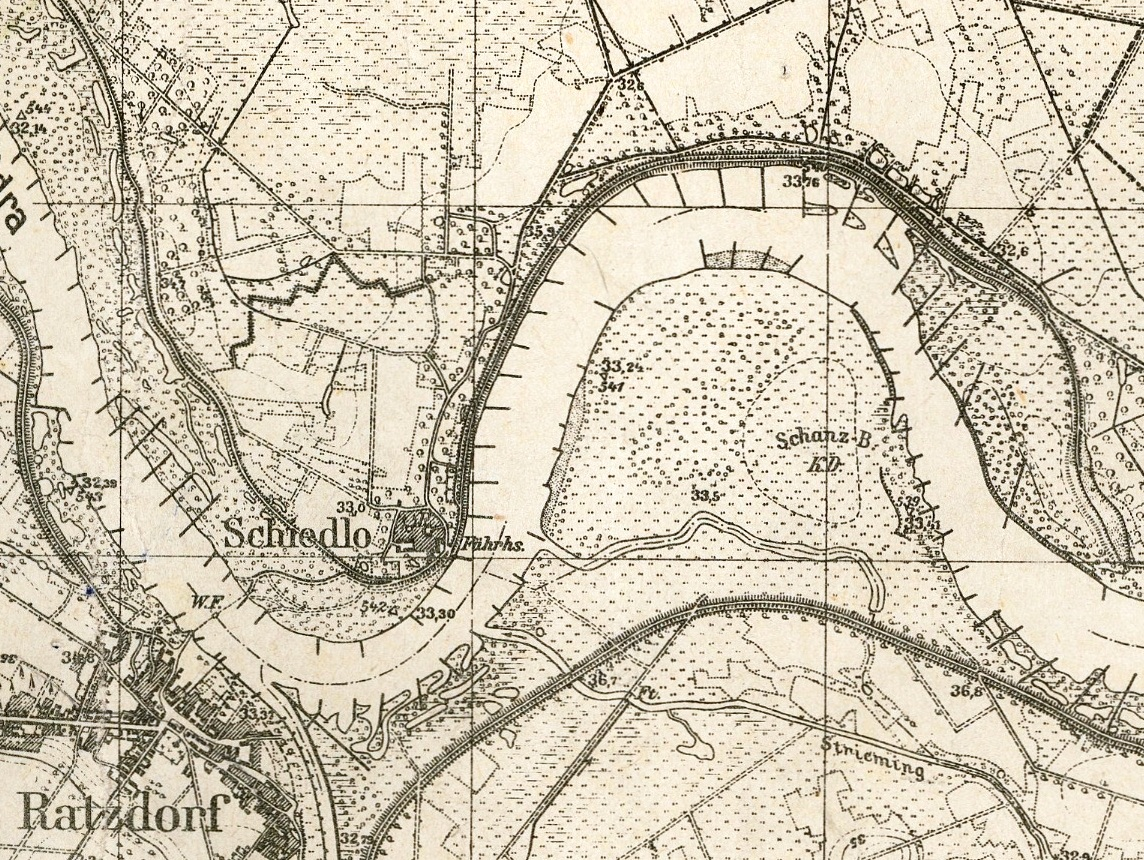
Schiedlo on the Oder River opposite the Neisse mouth at Ratzdorf, Neißemünde, 1934 map

The area formed part of Poland since the establishment of the state in the 10th century. There was a Polish defensive stronghold in Szydłów, which was part of the first line of defense along the Nysa Łużycka River, in the event of a possible German invasion from the west. The settlement arose from the stronghold near the confluence of the Oder and Nysa rivers. Following Poland's fragmentation, it initially formed part of the Duchy of Silesia, and later of the Duchy of Legnica, both provincial duchies of Piast-ruled Poland. In 1249 the Silesian Duke Bolesław II the Bald of Legnica granted it to the Lusatian margrave Henry III the Illustrious from the House of Wettin, in turn for his mediation in the inheritance conflict with his brother Duke Henry III the White of Wrocław. It remained a village at the northeastern edge of Lower Lusatia, the only one east of the Oder River. From 1319 on it was a possession of Neuzelle Abbey. In the 14th century the village passed to Bohemia (Czechia). In 1469 it passed to Hungary, and in 1490 it fell back to Bohemia.

With Lower Lusatia, it fell to Saxony by the 1635 Peace of Prague, and in 1697–1763 it was ruled by Kings Augustus II the Strong and Augustus III of Poland within the Polish-Saxon union. It fell to Prussia according to the Final Act of the 1815 Congress of Vienna. Incorporated into the Province of Brandenburg, from 1871 it also formed part of the German Empire. After the defeat of Nazi Germany in World War II, in 1945, the area became again part of Poland with the implementation of the Oder–Neisse line as the Polish border with East Germany (see Territorial changes of Poland after World War II). The village had already been abandoned in the early 20th century due to repeated floodings.
