= Thomas Goppel =

German politician (born 1947)

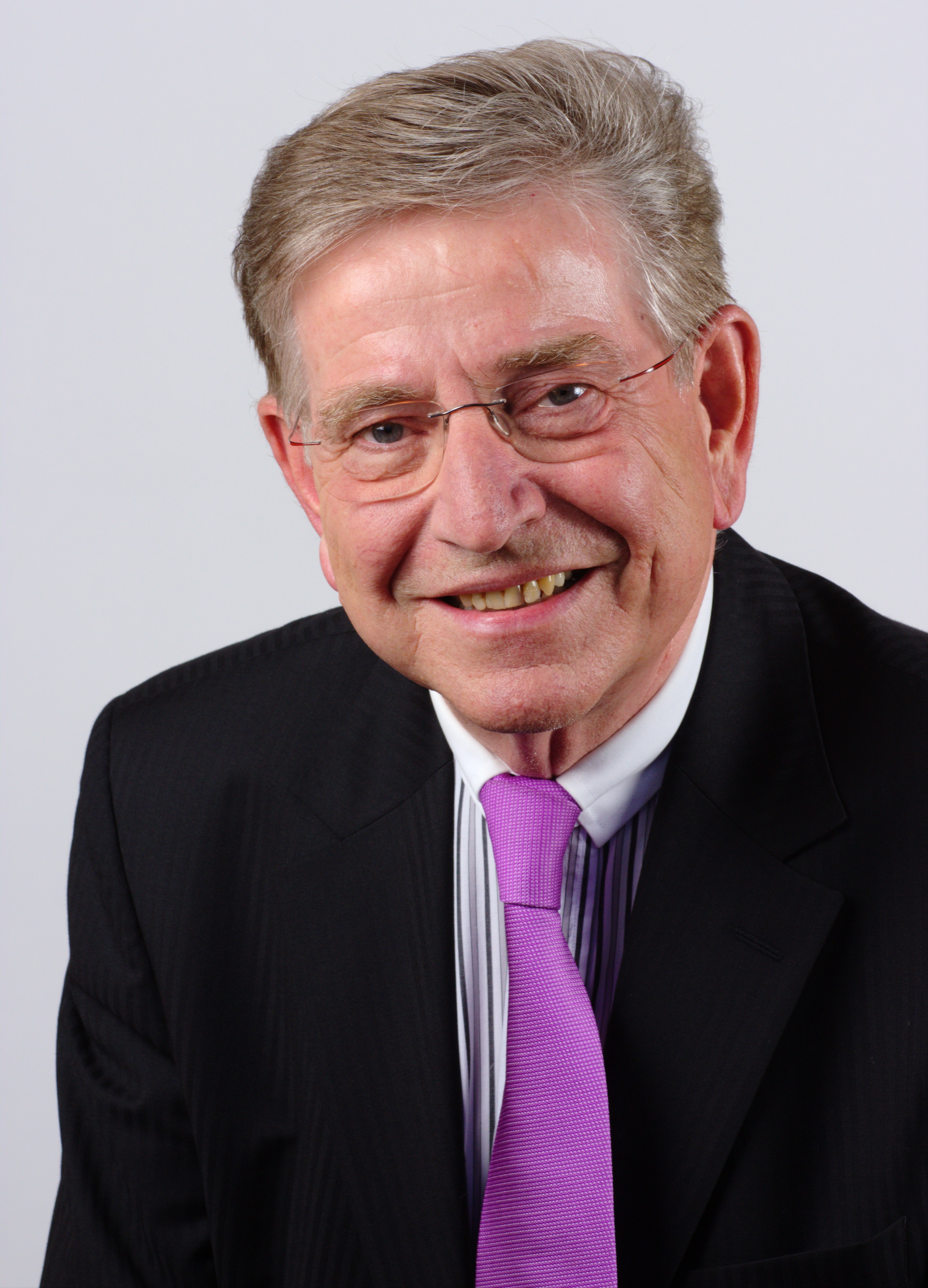
Thomas Goppel in 2012

Thomas Goppel (born 30 April 1947 in Aschaffenburg, Lower Franconia, Bavaria) is a German politician and party member of the CSU party. Goppel was member of the Landtag of Bavaria from 1974 to 2018. He is the son of the former Bavarian Minister President Alfons Goppel and was a member of the Bavarian State Government from 1986 to 1998 and from 2003 to 2008. Amongst others, Goppel served as State Minister for Federal and European Affairs (1990-1994), as State Minister for Regional Development and Environment (1994-1998), as well as State Minister for Science, Research, and Arts (2003-2008). From 1998 to 2003, Goppel was Secretary General of the CSU party. Goppel is a cousin of Konrad Zdarsa, the bishop of the Augsburg Diocese.

Goppel is married.
