= Ordinariate for foreign students in Belgium =

The Ordinariate for foreign students in Belgium (or Ordinariaat voor buitenlandse studenten in België in Dutch or Ordinariat aux Etudiants étrangers en Belgique in French) was a Roman Catholic ordinariate (pseudo-diocesan jurisdiction) for the academic community of foreign students in Belgium.

== History ==
It was established on 31 August 1965.

Its only incumbent was Albert Louis Descamps (August 31, 1965 – October 15, 1980), Titular Bishop of Tunes (November 3, 1960 – October 15, 1980), Auxiliary Bishop of Tournai (Belgium) (November 3, 1960 – 1964), also Secretary of the Pontifical Biblical Commission (1973 – October 15, 1980).

It was suppressed on 15 October 1980, after his death aged 64.

== Source and external links ==
- GigaCatholic
