= Wolfgang Ipolt =

German priest

- Bishop of Görlitz
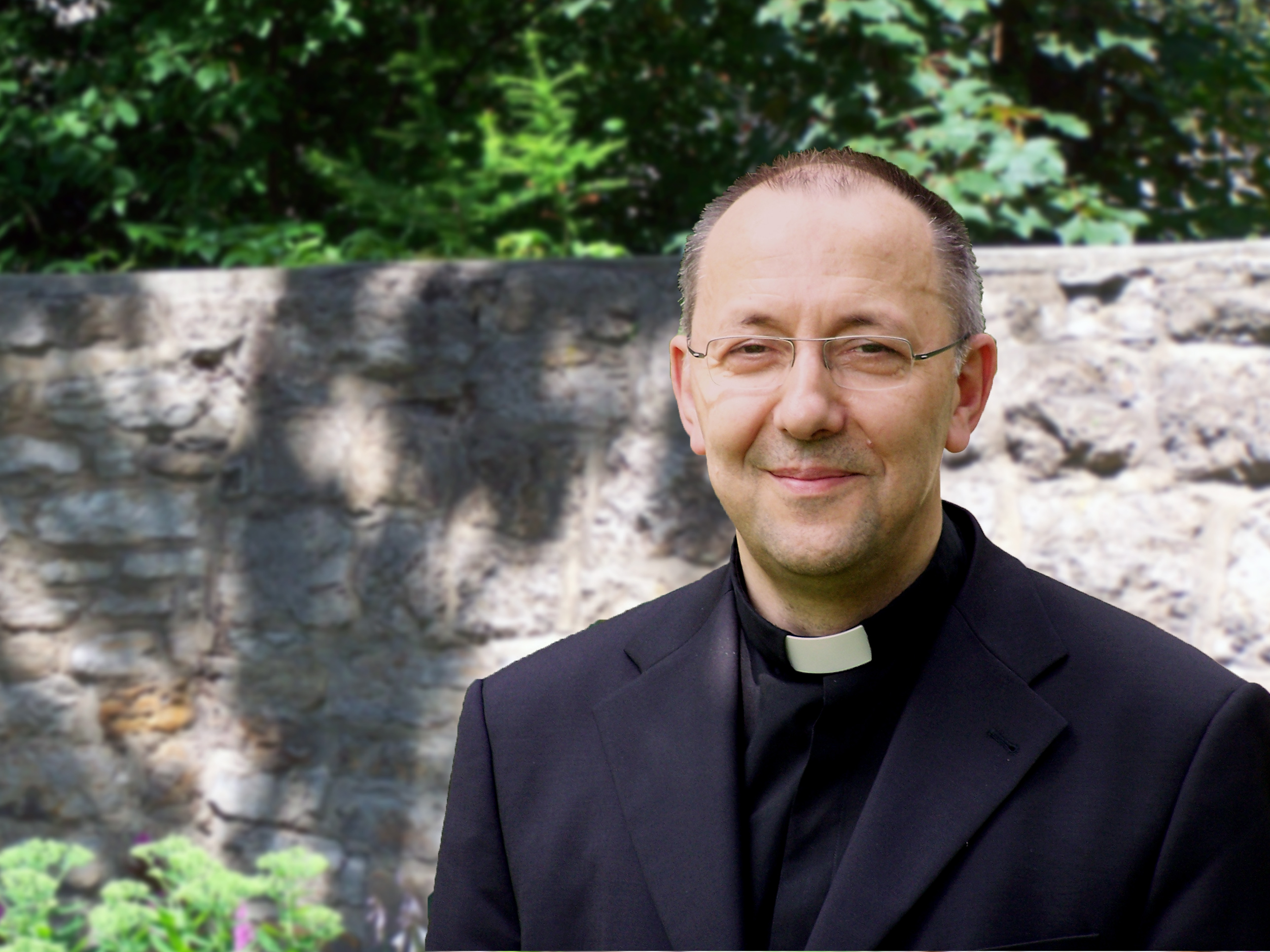
- Bishop Wolfgang Ipolt in Erfurt
- Church: Catholic Church
- Diocese: Diocese of Görlitz
- Appointed: 18 June 2011
- Predecessor: Konrad Zdarsa

Orders
- Ordination: 30 June 1979
- Consecration: 28 August 2011 by Rainer Woelki

Personal details
- Born: 17 March 1954 (age 72) Gotha, Bezirk Erfurt, German Democratic Republic

Wolfgang Ipolt (born 17 March 1954) is a German Roman Catholic bishop of Roman Catholic Diocese of Görlitz.

== Life ==
Ipolt was born in Gotha. He studied Roman Catholic theology and philosophy at University of Erfurt. On 30 June 1979 Ipolt became priest in Erfurt. On 28 August 2011 he became ordained bishop of Görlitz in Germany, replacing Konrad Zdarsa.
