= Neuzelle Abbey =

Cistercian monastery in Lower Lusatia, Germany

Coordinates: 52°05′26″N 14°39′08″E

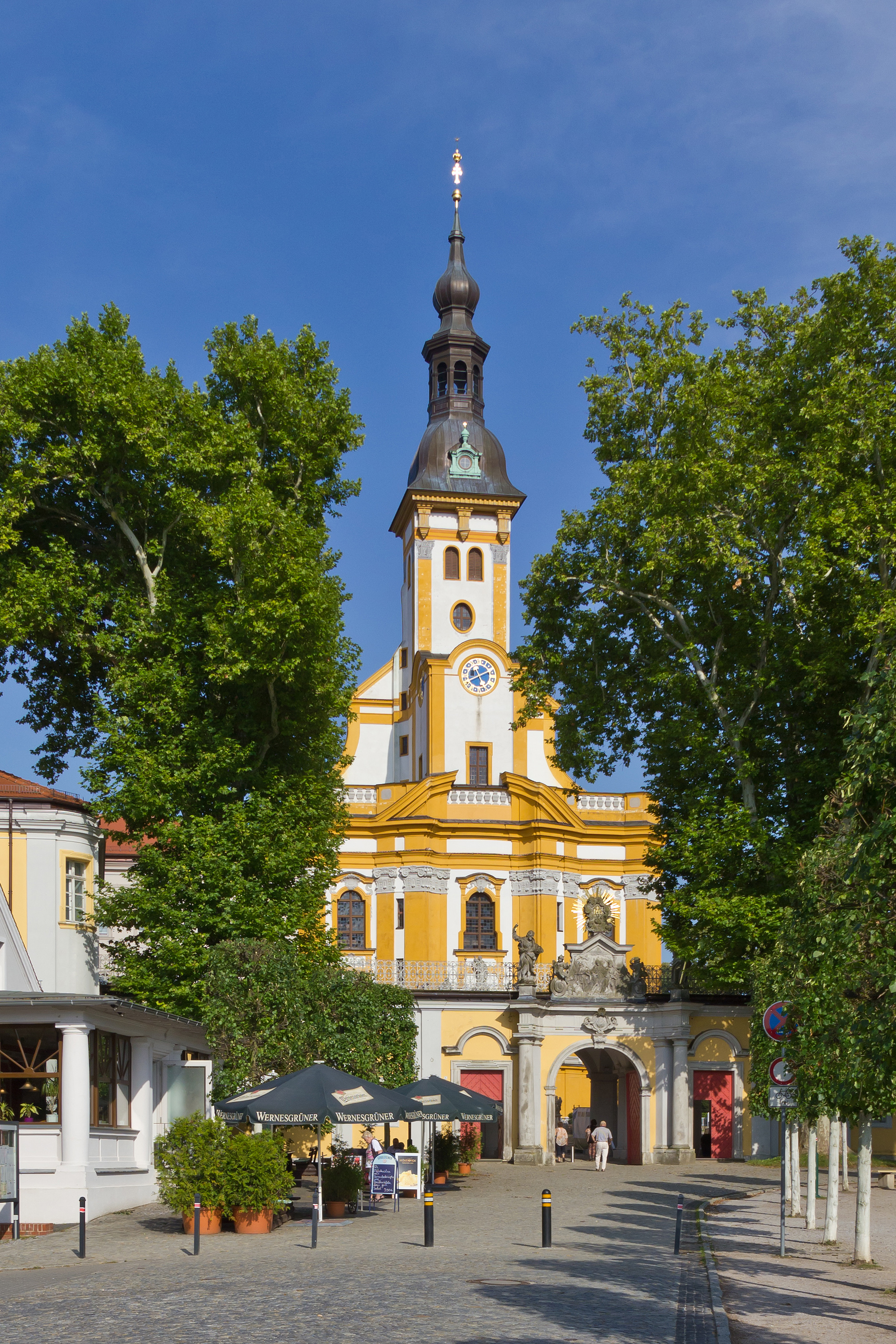
Abbey Church

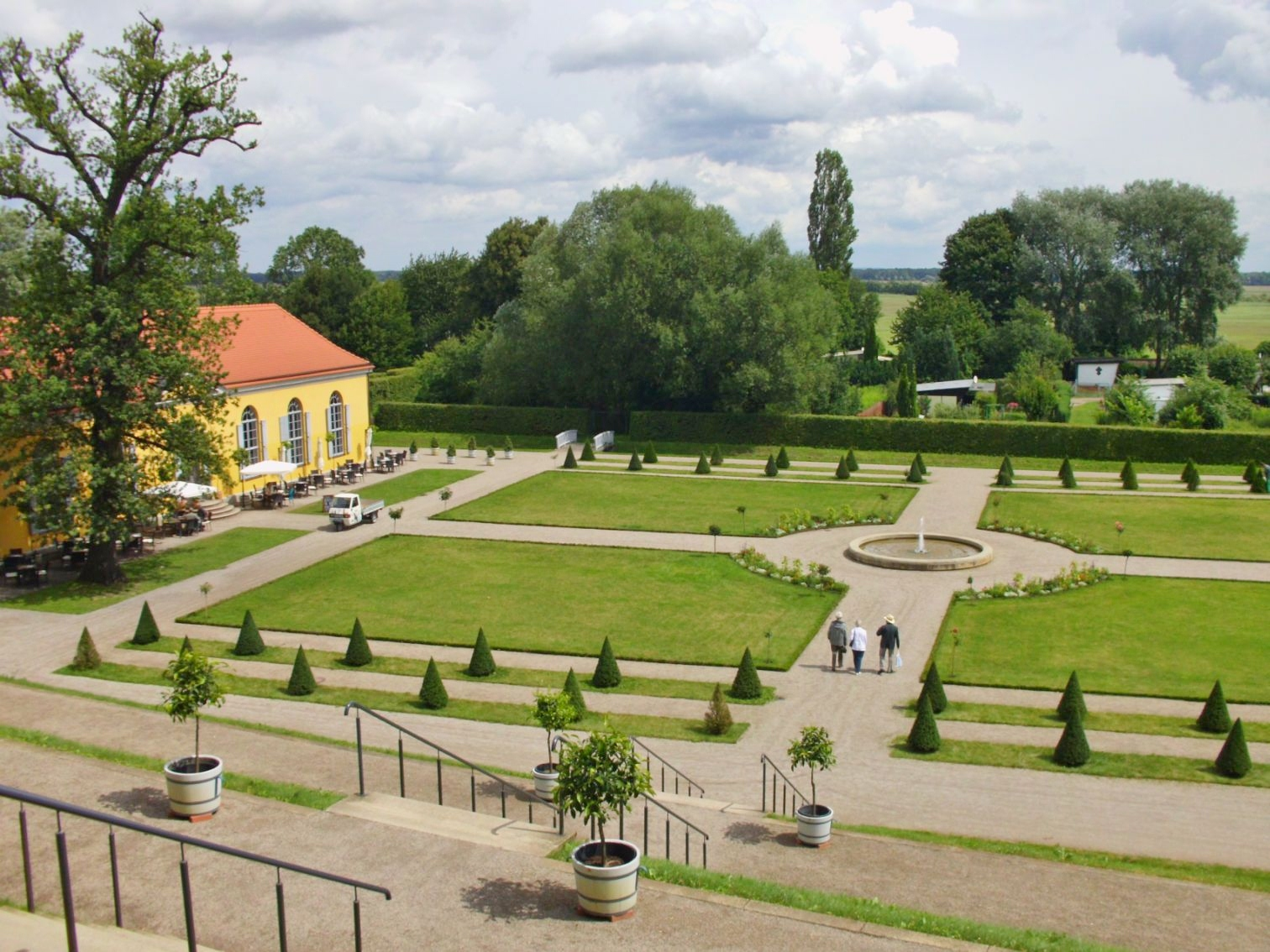
Kloster Neuzelle-Klostergarten und Orangerie

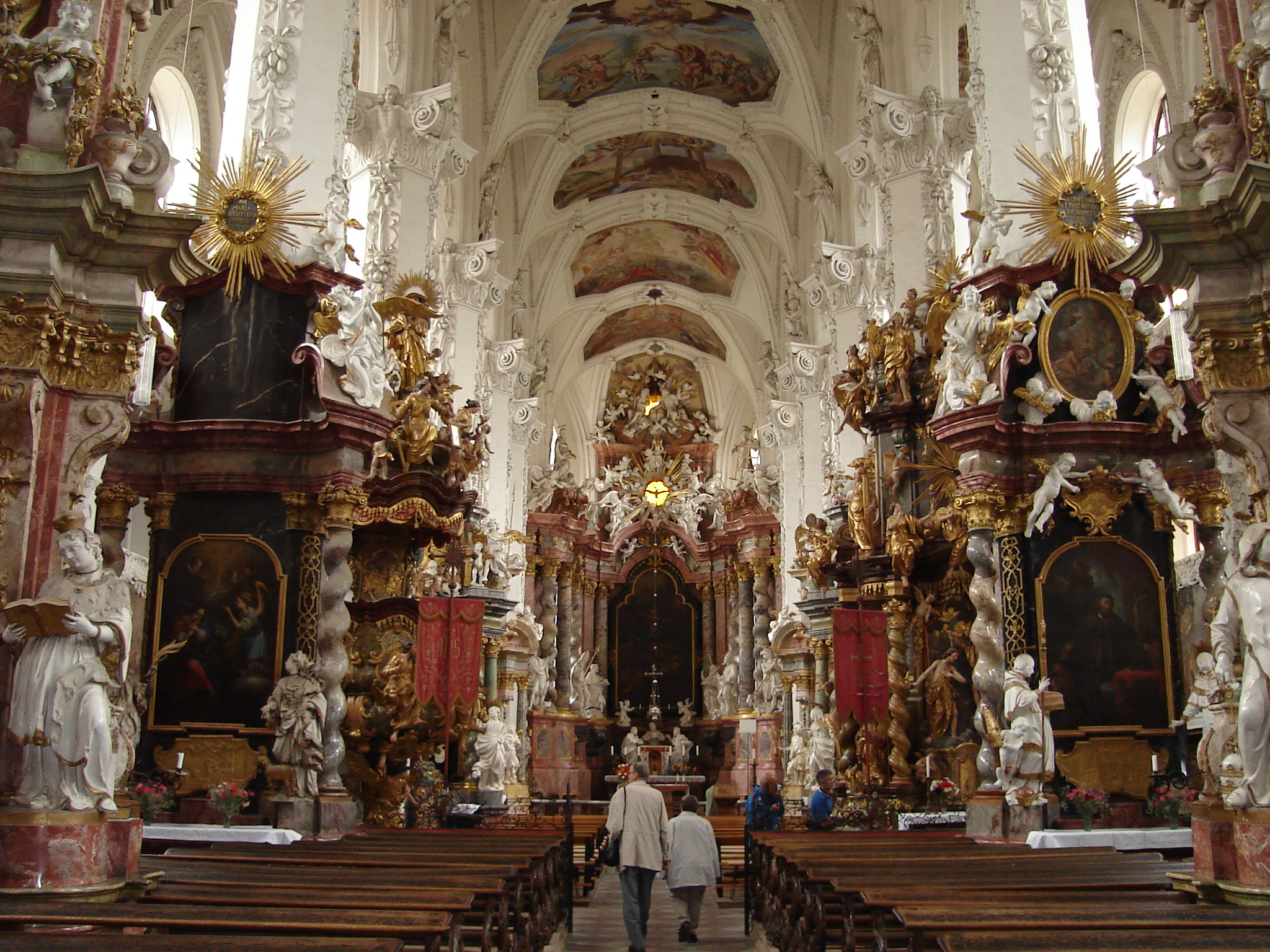
Abbey Church interior

Neuzelle Abbey is a Cistercian monastery in Lower Lusatia, Germany, in the historic border region between Lower Lusatia and the March of Brandenburg. It is regarded as one of the most significant Baroque monuments in the North of Germany. The monastery complex consists of several churches, cloister, cloister garden and a brewery.

== History ==
The Abbey was founded as Nova Cella in 1268 by Henry the Illustrious, Margrave of Meissen and Lusatia for the benefit of the soul of his deceased wife Agnes. It was repeatedly destroyed by the Hussites in the 15th century. Since the monks refused to follow the teachings of Jan Hus, they were killed or abducted and later glorified as martyrs.

Neuzelle was rebuilt around 1500. It survived during Reformation as a Roman Catholic Abbey in a region were most people followed Martin Luther around 1550. Most of the monks that settled in Neuzelle were from Bohemia, studying at the Charles University in Prague. Neuzelle could even continue when it fell to Saxony as a consequence of the Thirty Years War, since the Emperor reserved certain rights to himself and closely attached the abbey ecclesiastically to Prague.

In 1817, with the Vienna Congress, parts of Lower Lusatia fell to Prussia and were incorporated into the Province of Brandenburg. Thus, the abbey was finally secularised by the order of King Frederick William III. Since 1820, the abbey buildings have been used for educational and administrative work whereas the abbey churches have remained Roman Catholic and served as parish churches. In 1947 one of the churches was consecrated as Blessed Virgin Mary pilgrimage church.

Today the complex of Neuzelle Abbey is held by a public foundation run by the state of Brandenburg.

== Architecture ==
Neuzelle is a Baroque style abbey, which is up to this day an oddity in Brandenburg, an area mainly dominated by Gothic churches. Neuzelle Abbey was first built and renovated in Gothic style. Gothic elements of the original building still can be found in the cloister and enclosure such as cross-ribbed structures, sculptures, corbel decoration and late medieval paintings.

The Baroque redesigning of the abbey commenced in 1650. The enclosure buildings, the church and the administrative building – with its “Princely wing” – are located to the north of the central courtyard. Extending to the west is the arcade, with the entrance portal and the foundation registry. The “coach stalls” are located in the south, while the cloister garden extends to the east. The foundation church and the “peoples’ church”, both displaying South German and Bohemian Baroque styles, represented the new significance of the abbey in the 18th century.

An altar at the Neuzelle abbey church is dedicated to John of Nepomuk, Archbishop of Prague. The Infant Jesus from the church Santa Maria de Victoria in Prague is considered to have provided the model for the altar of the Divine Infant at the Neuzelle abbey church.

A Baroque garden was established at Neuzelle Abbey in 1760. The abbey‘s location provided the opportunity for an elongated terraced garden, which provides manifold views of the geometrically designed garden area and of the expanse of the Oder river meadows as well as of the abbey grounds.

The restoration of the historical abbey was completed for Neuzelle Abbey's 750th anniversary in 2018.

== Repopulation ==
=== Founding ===
In 2018, after some time of consideration, the Austrian Abbey of Heiligenkreuz refounded Neuzelle Abbey as a Priory by request of the Bishop of Görlitz Wolfgang Ipolt. It was given the name "Maria Friedenshort". As the historic abbey grounds are owned by a state owned foundation there is no room for the monks. Therefore, they are planning on building a new monastery in Treppeln. As of 2024 clearing work has started on the historic Stasi-grounds and they are currently building a provisional monastery in Bernhardshof in Treppeln.

=== Monks ===
The Priory of Maria Friedenshort currently consists of eight monks. Seven monks with solemn profession, one monk with temporary profession and two novices. The current Prior of Neuzelle Abbey is Pater Simeon Wester OCist, who was the previous Prior of Heiligenkreuz. The Subprior is Pater Kilian Müller OCist, who is also the economist.

=== Beata Maria Virgo Parish ===
The parish of Neuzelle is served by the monks of the abbey. As of 2019 the two catholic churches in Eisenhüttenstadt are a part of the Beata Maria Virgo Parish of Neuzelle. The abbeychurch in Neuzelle is also a part of the parish, as are two more chapels in Neuzelle. Currently Pater Isaak Maria Käfferlein OCist serves as pastor and Pater Niklaus Schneider OCist as chaplain.
