= Walter Mixa =

Bishop of Augsburg from 2005 to 2010

- Bishop of Augsburg
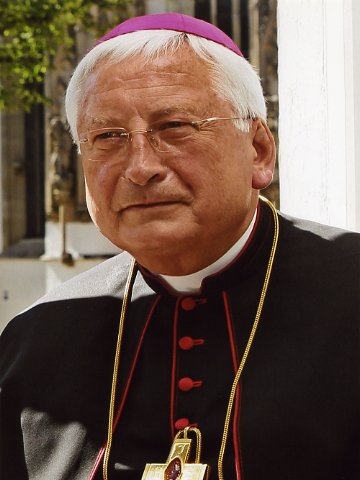
- Walter Mixa (2008)
- Diocese: Augsburg
- In office: 16 July 2005 – 8 May 2010
- Predecessor: Viktor Josef Dammertz
- Successor: Konrad Zdarsa

Personal details
- Born: 25 April 1941 (age 85) Königshütte, Silesia
- Denomination: Roman Catholic

Coat of arms of Walter Mixa

Walter Johannes Mixa (born 25 April 1941) is a German prelate of the Catholic Church who is the Bishop of Augsburg and Ordinary Emeritus of the Bundeswehr. He resigned as bishop of Military and Bishop of Augsburg on 8 May 2010 at age 69 after accusations he severely beat children at a Schrobenhausen orphanage in the 1970s and misappropriated the orphanage's funds. Mixa reportedly sexually abused minors, including an altar boy; the Office of Public Prosecution opened investigation which it closed, citing insufficient evidence. He was also accused also of sexually abusing seminarians between 1996 and 2005.

== Biography ==
Mixa was born in Königshütte, Silesia (today Chorzów, Poland). His family fled to Western Germany at the end of World War II. Mixa passed his Abitur in 1964 and studied Catholic theology in University of Dillingen and University of Fribourg. He was ordained in 1970 in Augsburg and thereafter he studied for his doctorate at the University of Augsburg. From 1973 to 1996 he also worked as a religion teacher in Schrobenhausen. In 1975 Mixa became a parish priest in Schrobenhausen and bishop of Eichstätt in 1996. In August 2000 Mixa was appointed Catholic Military Bishop of the Bundeswehr by Pope John Paul II. In July 2005 Mixa became Bishop of Augsburg. On 21 March 2012 he was appointed a Member of the Pontifical Council for the Pastoral Care of Health Care Workers by Pope Benedict XVI.

=== Beliefs ===
Mixa is described as being conservative and close to Pope Benedict XVI. According to The Times newspaper, Mixa is outspoken and "has railed against the German Government for making "birth machines" out of women" and has "compared abortion to the Holocaust". He has also condemned Israel's treatment of Palestinians in the Occupied Territories and has said of the 2010 child abuse scandal that "the sexual revolution of the 1960s is at least partly to blame for this".

=== Abuse allegations ===
In March 2010 he was accused of physical abuse by five ex-pupils of a children's care home, where Mixa served as a visiting priest in the 1970s and 1980s. He denied the allegations. Further accusers have come forward and the bishop says that he cannot remember any of them. In April 2010 Mixa stated that he cannot exclude having slapped children 20–30 years ago saying he was "sorry for causing many people grief", though, according to BBC, he didn't explain what exactly he meant.

On 21 April 2010 he offered his resignation to Pope Benedict XVI, and the Vatican removed Mixa as Bishop of Augsburg on 8 May. Benedict XVI met with Mixa on 1 July and confirmed his acceptance of Mixa's resignation. The Holy See Press Office reported that Mixa "confirmed having committed errors and mistakes, which caused a loss of confidence and made the resignation inevitable".

=== Appearance for the AfD ===
In January 2019, he attended an event sponsored by city councilman Eberhard Brett, a member of Germany's far-right AfD party, to discuss the role of Muslims in German society. The former Bishop Mixa spoke to around 35 listeners. After heavy criticism, a planned appearance by former Bishop Mixa at an AfD event were cancelled. The diocese of Augsburg said that further appearance would be "expressly rejected and not approved" by Bishop Konrad Zdarsa and his vicar general Harald Heinrich.

== Notes and references ==
Catholic Church titles
Preceded by Viktor Josef Dammertz	Bishop of Augsburg; 2005 – 2010	Succeeded by Konrad Zdarsa
