= Neuzelle =

- Municipality
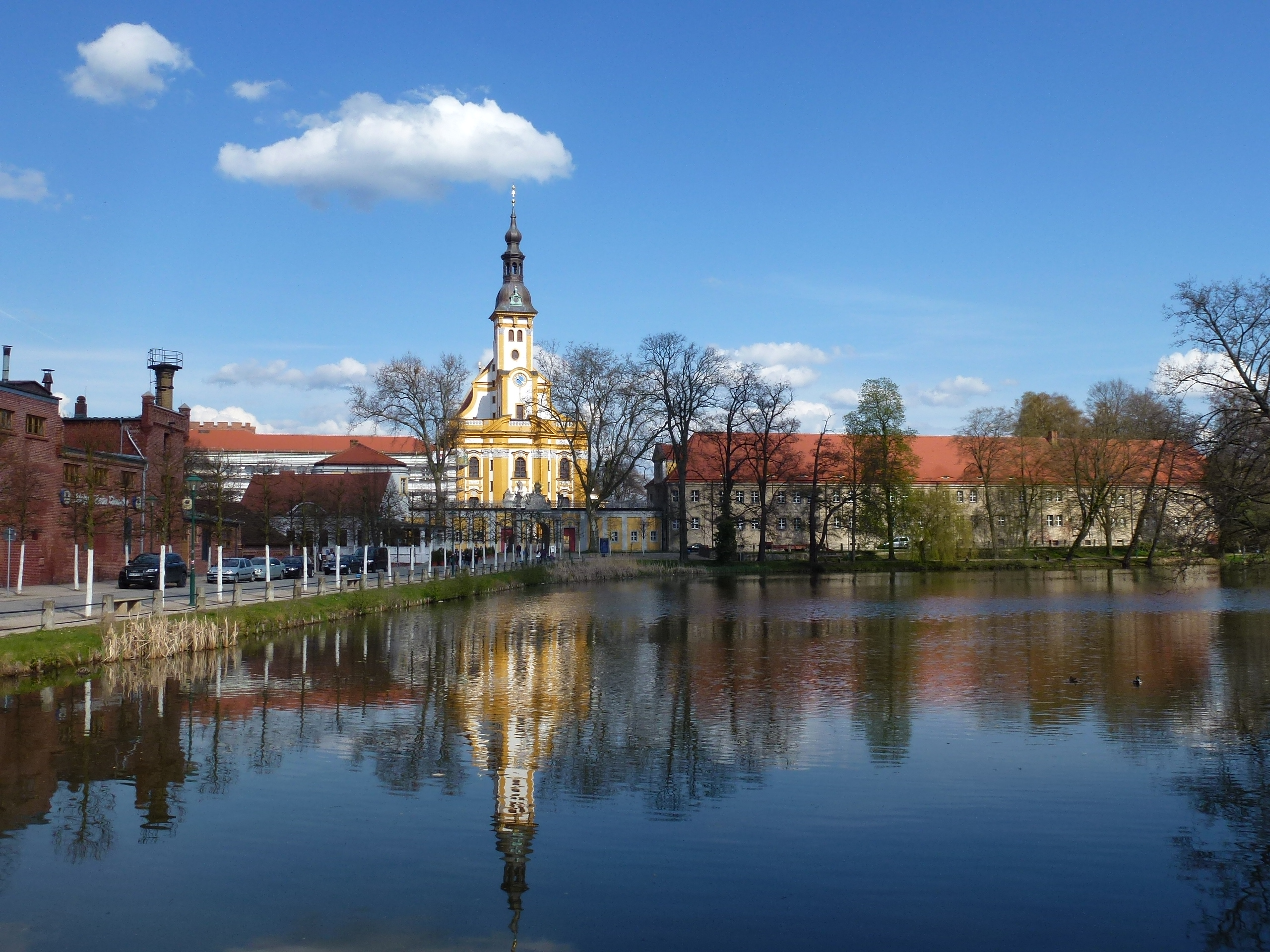
- Neuzelle brewery (left) and abbey church

- Coat of arms

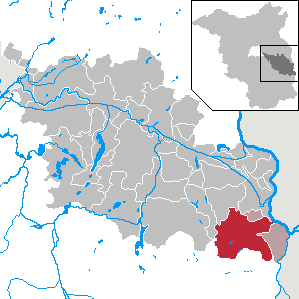
- Location of Neuzelle within Oder-Spree district
- Interactive map of Neuzelle
- Location within Germany Location within Brandenburg
- Coordinates: 52°05′N 14°38′E
- Country: Germany
- State: Brandenburg
- District: Oder-Spree
- Municipal assoc.: Neuzelle
- Subdivisions: 11 districts

Government
  - Mayor (2024–29): Sven Budach

Area
  - Total: 135.00 km^{2} (52.12 sq mi)
- Elevation: 43 m (141 ft)

Population (2025-12-31)
  - Total: 4,169
  - Density: 30.88/km^{2} (79.98/sq mi)
- Time zone: UTC+01:00 (CET)
  - Summer (DST): UTC+02:00 (CEST)
- Postal codes: 15898
- Dialling codes: 033652
- Vehicle registration: LOS
- Website: www.neuzelle.de

Neuzelle (Lower Sorbian: Nowa Cala, pronounced [ˈnɔwa ˈtsala]) is a municipality in the Oder-Spree district of Brandenburg, Germany, the administrative seat of Amt (collective municipality) Neuzelle. It is best known for Cistercian Neuzelle Abbey and its Neuzeller Kloster Brewery.

== Geography ==
Neuzelle is situated in the north of the historic Lower Lusatia region near the border with Poland, about 8 km (5.0 mi) south of Eisenhüttenstadt. The municipal area along the Dorche creek, a tributary of the Oder River, since 2001 also comprises the villages of Bahro, Bomsdorf, Göhlen, Henzendorf, Kobbeln, Möbiskruge, Ossendorf, Schwerzko, Steinsdorf, Streichwitz, and Treppeln. In the west, it stretches up to the Schlaube Valley Nature Park.

== History ==
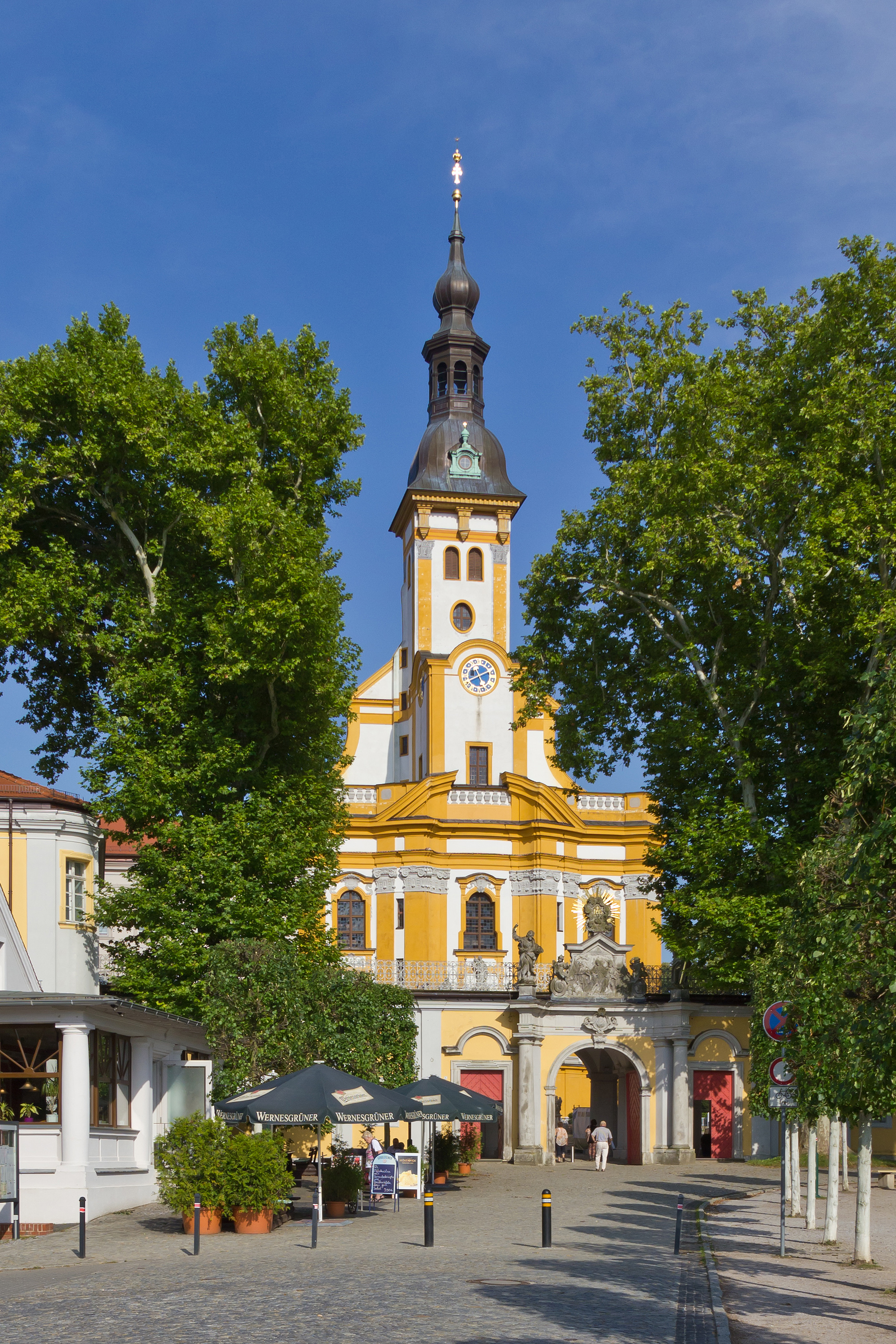
Abbey Church

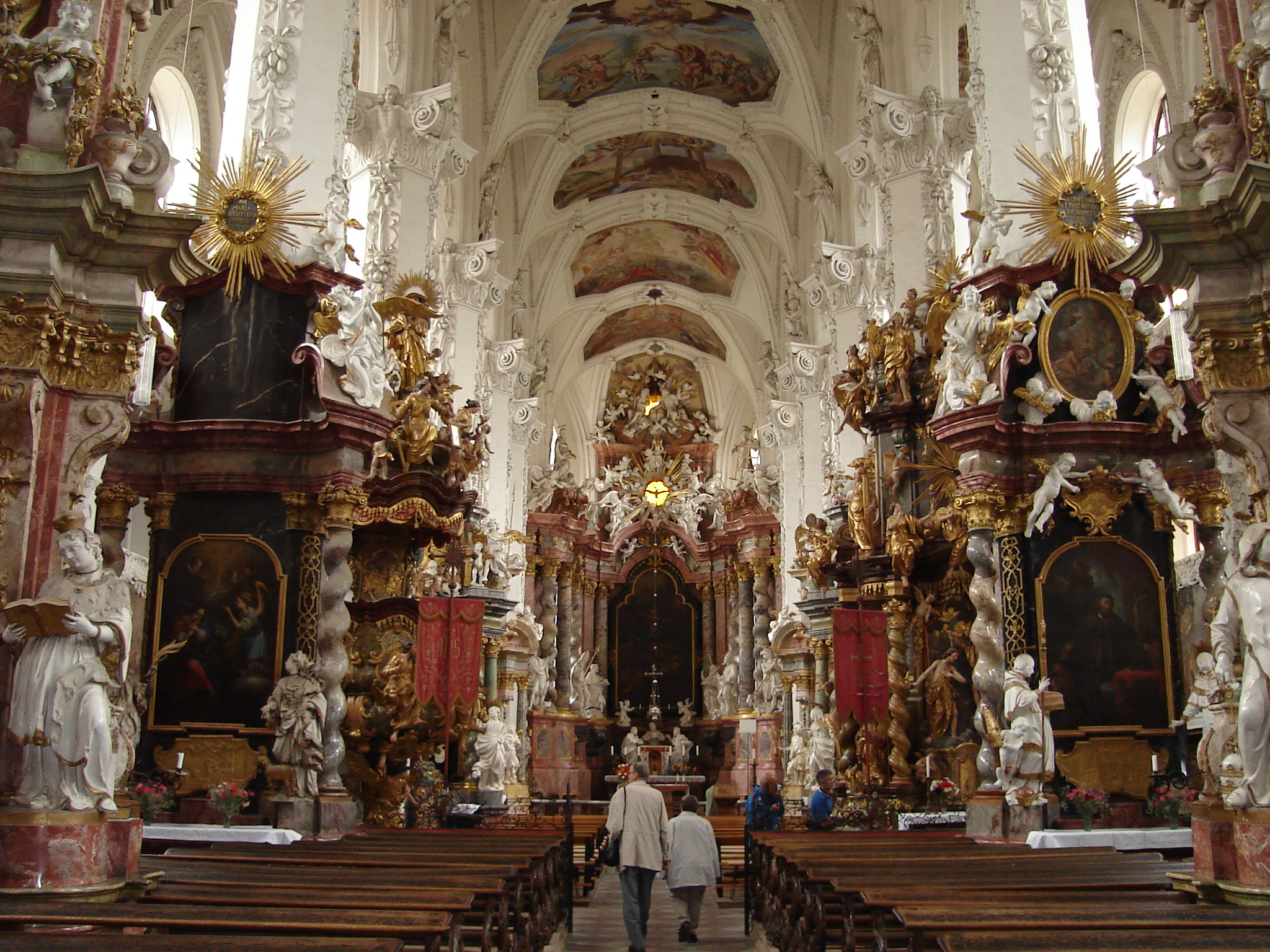
Abbey Church interior

The abbey was established as Nova Cella on 12 October 1268 by the Wettin margrave Henry III of Lusatia in remembrance of his deceased wife Agnes of Bohemia. Henry had acquired the strip of former Lubusz Land up to Fürstenberg (today's Eisenhüttenstadt) from the Silesian duke Bolesław II Rogatka in turn for his mediation in the duke's conflict with his Piast brother Henry III the White.

Neuzelle was a filial monastery of the Cistercian Altzella Abbey (Cella) near Nossen in Henry's Margraviate of Meissen. A first convent of brothers took residence here in 1281. From about 1300, a monastery complex was laid out, including a Brick Gothic hall church, which soon became the spiritual centre of the region. The monks were granted large estates, up to Fürstenberg am Oder in the north and Szydłów (Schiedlo) beyond the Oder River in the east.

In 1367, Neuzelle with Lower Lusatia was purchased by the Luxembourg Emperor Charles IV in his capacity as King of Bohemia. The premises were devastated during the Hussite Wars in 1429 and the monks killed or abducted. Rebuilt afterwards, the monastery and its extended possessions with the Lands of the Bohemian Crown became part of the Habsburg monarchy in 1526. It remained Catholic during the Protestant Reformation, even after the Lutheran Electorate of Saxony had acquired the Lusatias from the Habsburg Emperor Ferdinand II by the 1635 Peace of Prague. Heavily demolished in the Thirty Years' War, the church was again rebuilt in a Baroque style including rich interior decorations quite unique in Northern Germany.

By the Final Act of the 1815 Vienna Congress, Lower Lusatia fell to Prussia and was incorporated into the Province of Brandenburg, where it remained until 1947. The abbey was finally securalised by the order of King Frederick William III two years later. The buildings were later used as an orphanage and a teachers' seminary institution. Nevertheless, while the Neuzelle parish church turned Protestant, the abbey church remained Catholic and in 1947 was consecrated as Blessed Virgin Mary pilgrimage church. Today the monastery complex is held by a public foundation run by the State of Brandenburg.

After World War II, Neuzelle was incorporated into the State of Brandenburg from 1947 to 1952 and the Bezirk Frankfurt of East Germany from 1952 to 1990. Since 1990, Neuzelle is again part of Brandenburg.

== Demography ==
Development of population since 1875 within the current boundaries (Blue line: Population; Dotted line: Comparison to population development of Brandenburg state; Grey background: Time of Nazi rule; Red background: Time of communist rule)

Neuzelle: Population development
within the current boundaries (2013)

Year	Pop.	±% p.a.
1875	5,271	—
1890	5,055	−0.28%
1910	4,782	−0.28%
1925	4,625	−0.22%
1933	4,824	+0.53%
1939	4,616	−0.73%
1946	6,296	+4.53%
1950	6,279	−0.07%
1964	5,279	−1.23%
1971	4,758	−1.47%
1981	4,355	−0.88%
1985	4,179	−1.03%
1989	4,040	−0.84%
1990	3,975	−1.61%
1991	3,973	−0.05%
1992	4,163	+4.78%
1993	4,344	+4.35%
1994	4,424	+1.84%
1995	4,418	−0.14%
1996	4,488	+1.58%

Year	Pop.	±% p.a.
1997	4,552	+1.43%
1998	4,402	−3.30%
1999	4,501	+2.25%
2000	4,662	+3.58%
2001	4,616	−0.99%
2002	4,563	−1.15%
2003	4,623	+1.31%
2004	4,680	+1.23%
2005	4,641	−0.83%
2006	4,592	−1.06%
2007	4,582	−0.22%
2008	4,539	−0.94%
2009	4,497	−0.93%
2010	4,471	−0.58%
2011	4,404	−1.50%
2012	4,344	−1.36%
2013	4,319	−0.58%
2014	4,315	−0.09%
2015	4,302	−0.30%
2016	4,281	−0.49%

== Twin town ==
- Langenberg, Westphalia, Germany

== Sons and daughters of the community ==
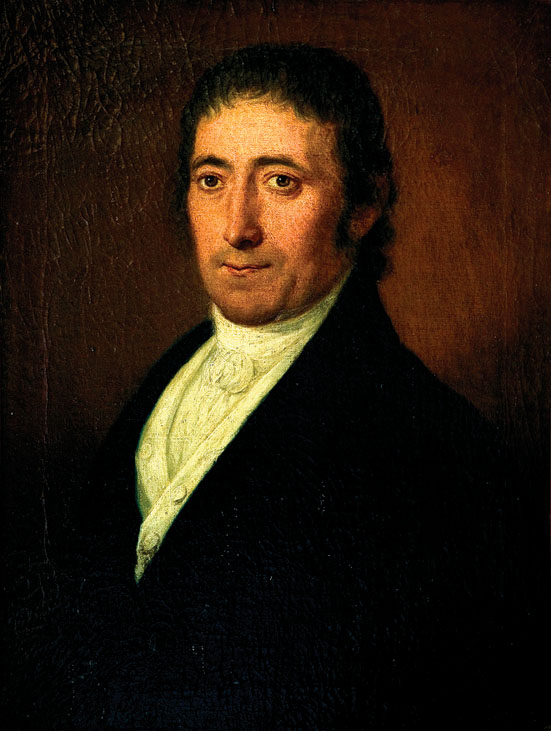
János Donát was born in Neuzelle

- Ignaz Bernhard Mauermann (1786-1841), Catholic bishop
- Julius Fräßdorf (1857-1932), politician (SPD), Saxon President of the Landtag 1919-1923
- Klaus Grebasch (* 1947), soccer player, born in Bahro
- János Donát (1744 – 1830), German-born Hungarian painter
