= Viktor Josef Dammertz =

Bishop of Augsburg from 1992 to 2004

The Most Reverend Viktor Josef Dammertz O.S.B.
- Bishop of Augsburg
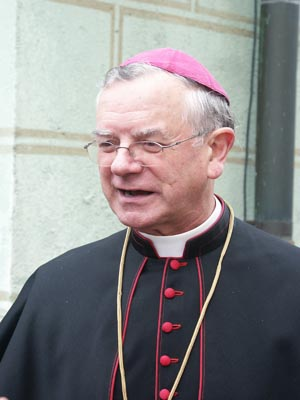
- Church: Roman Catholic Church
- Appointed: 24 December 1992
- Term ended: 9 June 2004
- Predecessor: Josef Stimpfle
- Successor: Walter Mixa
- Previous posts: 6th Abbot Primate of the Benedictine Confederation; Archabbot of St. Ottilien Archabbey; Abbot President of the St. Ottilien Congregation

Orders
- Ordination: 21 September 1957 by Bishop Josef Freundorfer
- Consecration: 30 January 1993 by Cardinal Friedrich Wetter

Personal details
- Born: Josef Dammertz; 8 June 1929 Schaephuysen, Germany
- Died: 2 March 2020 (aged 90) St. Ottilien Archabbey, Germany
- Buried: Augsburg Cathedral
- Education: J.C.D. 1960 Ludwig-Maximilians-Universität München
- Alma mater: Ludwig-Maximilians-Universität München; Pontificio Sant'Anselmo
- Motto: Für euch - mit euch For you - with you
- Coat of arms

Viktor Josef Dammertz (8 June 1929 – 2 March 2020) was a German Benedictine monk of St. Ottilien Archabbey located in Bavaria, Germany, which is part of the Benedictine Congregation of Saint Ottilien. He was elected and served as the sixth Abbot Primate of the Benedictine Confederation from 1977 to 1992. He was nominated by Pope John Paul II as Bishop of the Diocese of Augsburg on 24 December 1992, consecrated on 30 January 1993, and resigned on 9 June 2004.

== Biography ==
Josef Dammertz was born in Schaephuysen, Germany on 8 June 1929. His parents were Wilhelm and Engelina Dammertz, and he had a younger sister, Marga. He attended secondary schools graduating in 1950 from the Staatliches Gymnasium Adolfinum. In 1953, he entered monastic life at St. Ottilien Archabbey making his religious profession on 16 September 1954 and received the name Viktor. He continued his studies of philosophy and theology at Münster, Innsbruck, and the Pontificio Sant'Anselmo in Rome. He would be ordained a Roman Catholic priest on 21 September 1957. In 1957, he would begin studies in Canon Law at the Ludwig-Maximilians-Universität München where he would graduate in 1960 with a Doctorate in Canon Law (J.C.D.). His dissertation was entitled "Das Verfassungsrecht der benediktinischen Mönchskongregation in Geschichte und Gegenwart".

From 1960 to 1975, he would serve in many abbey and congregational assignments, which included missionary trips and attending the Second Vatican Council as the secretary to the Archabbot of St. Ottilien. On 8 January 1975, Dammertz would be elected as Archabbot of St. Ottilien Archabbey and President of the Congregation of Saint Ottilien. In this dual role of responsibility, he would travel the world visiting congregational monastic foundations. On 22 September 1977, he was elected as the sixth Abbot Primate of the Benedictine Confederation of the Order of Saint Benedict.

As Abbot Primate, he resided in Rome, Italy, while also overseeing Sant'Anselmo all'Aventino and promoting the "Pontificio Ateneo Sant'Anselmo" to the monasteries of the world. The Ateneo had been in danger of closure due to falling enrollment, so Dammertz undertook visits to over 750 monasteries around the world to support the institution. In addition, he was noted for his early development (with Abbess Máire Hickey of Dinklage Abbey) of the "Communio Internationalis Benedictinarum" (CIB) that would later serve as the international association for women's monastics. Dammertz resigned as Abbot Primate in 1992, after which he was nominated by Pope John Paul II on 24 December 1992 as the next Bishop of the Diocese of Augsburg, Germany.

Dammertz was consecrated as bishop on 30 January 1993 by Cardinal Friedrich Wetter, the Archbishop of the Archdiocese of Munich and Freising. During his tenure, Dammertz served in various German Bishops' Conference positions, as well as numerous Vatican congregations. At the required age of 75, he submitted his resignation which was accepted on 8 June 2004. He continued his life initially as a chaplain to a monastic community of sisters, but finally returned in 2018 to his home archabbey of St. Ottilien where he died peacefully on 7 March 2020. Due to his episcopal rank, he was buried in the Augsburg Cathedral.

== Bibliography ==
Dammertz had numerous books, articles, and interview content. His books and articles have been translated into over twenty different languages. He is also catalogued in the German National Library and WorldCat.

== Notes and references ==
Catholic Church titles
Preceded by Rembert Weakland	Abbot Primate of the Benedictine Confederation; 22 September 1977 – 19 September 1992	Succeeded by Jerome Theisen
Preceded by Josef Stimpfle	Bishop of Augsburg; 24 December 1992 – 9 June 2004	Succeeded by Walter Mixa
