= Dorche =

River in Germany

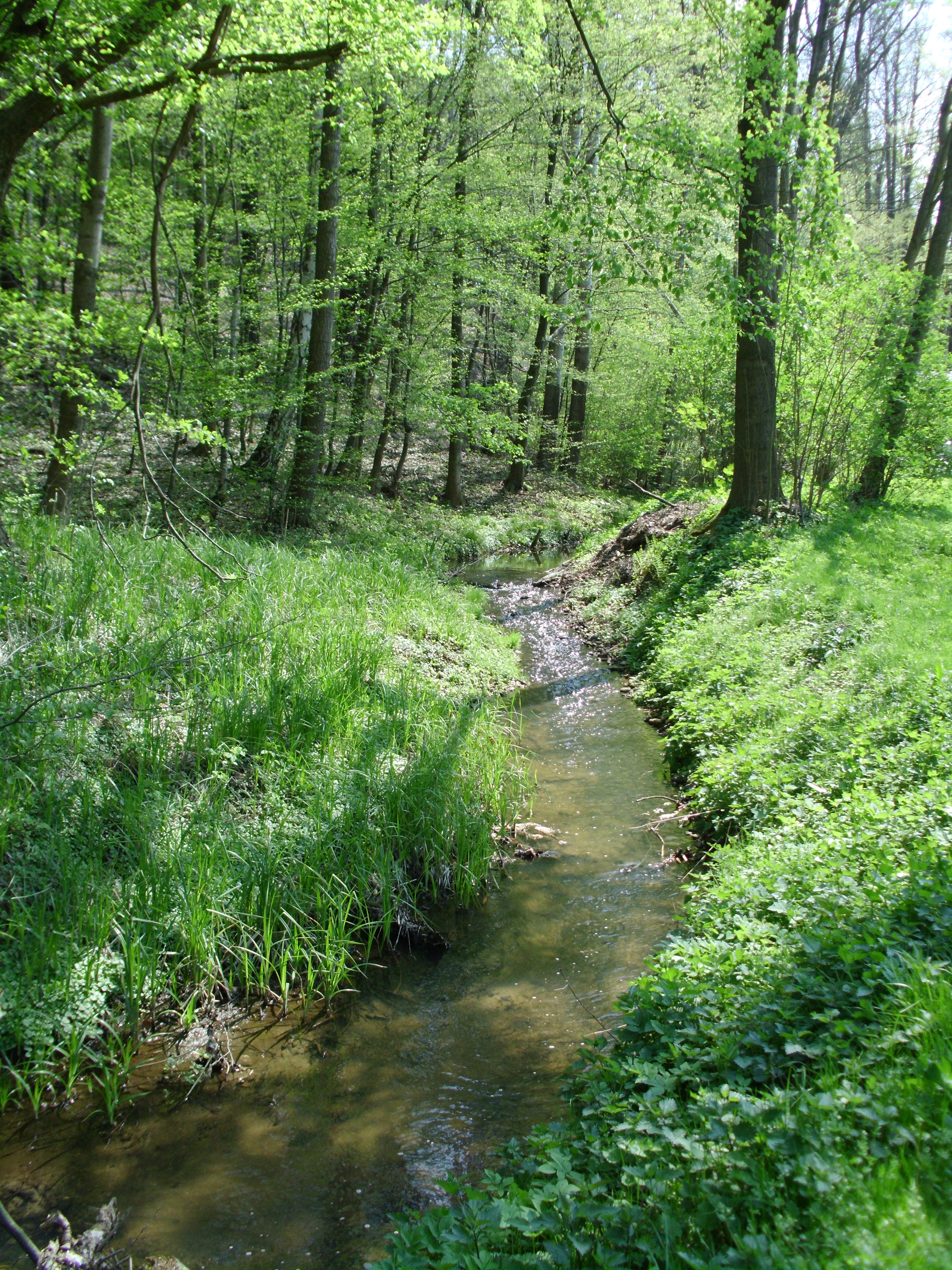

Location
- Country: Germany
- State: Brandenburg

Physical characteristics
- Mouth
  - location: Klosterteich in Neuzelle
  - coordinates: 52.0890°N 14.6509°E

Basin features
- Progression: Oder→ Baltic Sea

Dorche is a small river of Brandenburg, Germany. In Neuzelle it flows into the Klosterteich pond, which is drained by a small canal leading to the Oder–Spree Canal.

== See also ==
- List of rivers of Brandenburg
