= Prelate =

High-ranking member of the Christian clergy

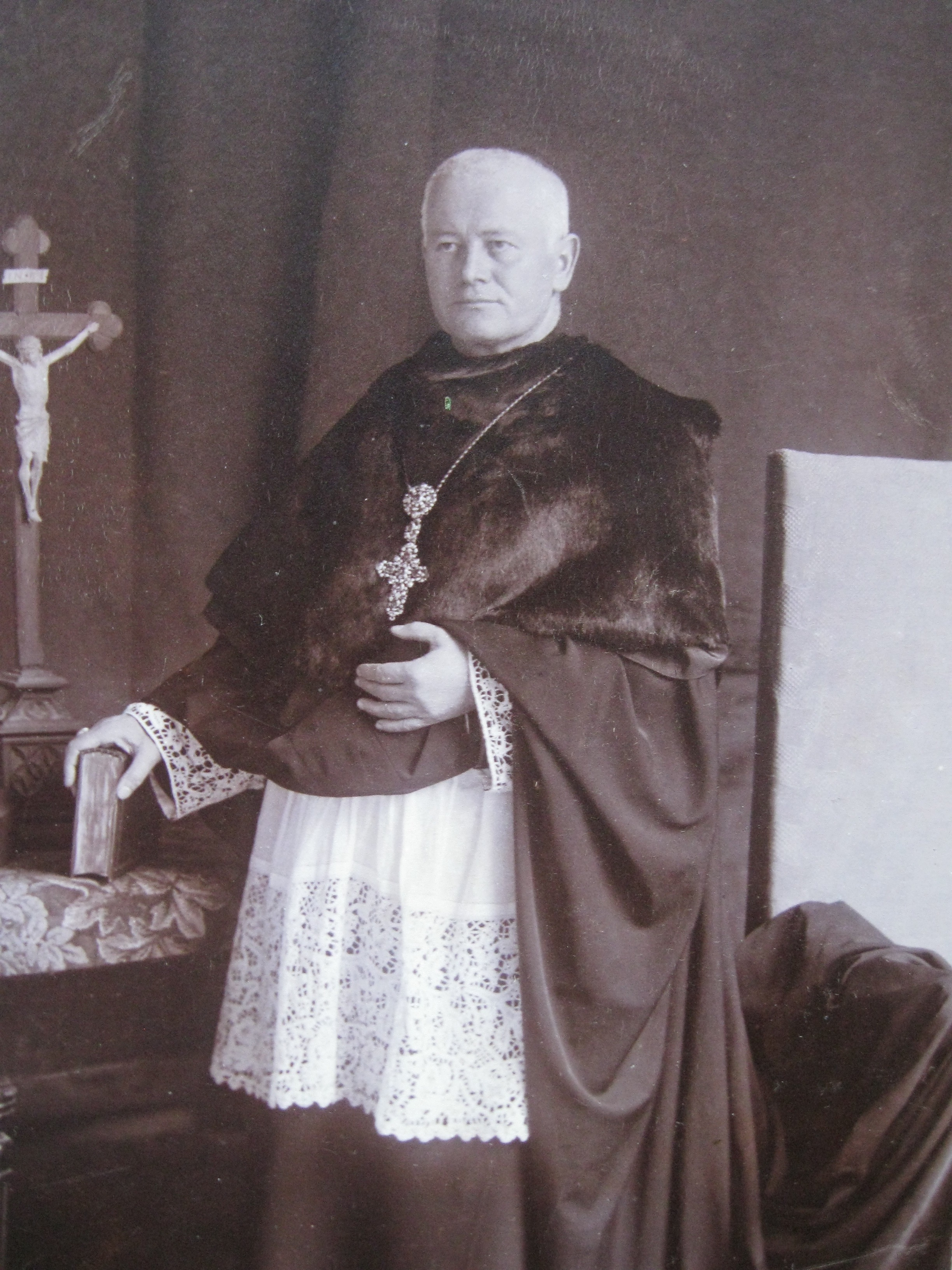
Benedictine and Archabbot Ildefons Schober in prelate dress and cappa magna

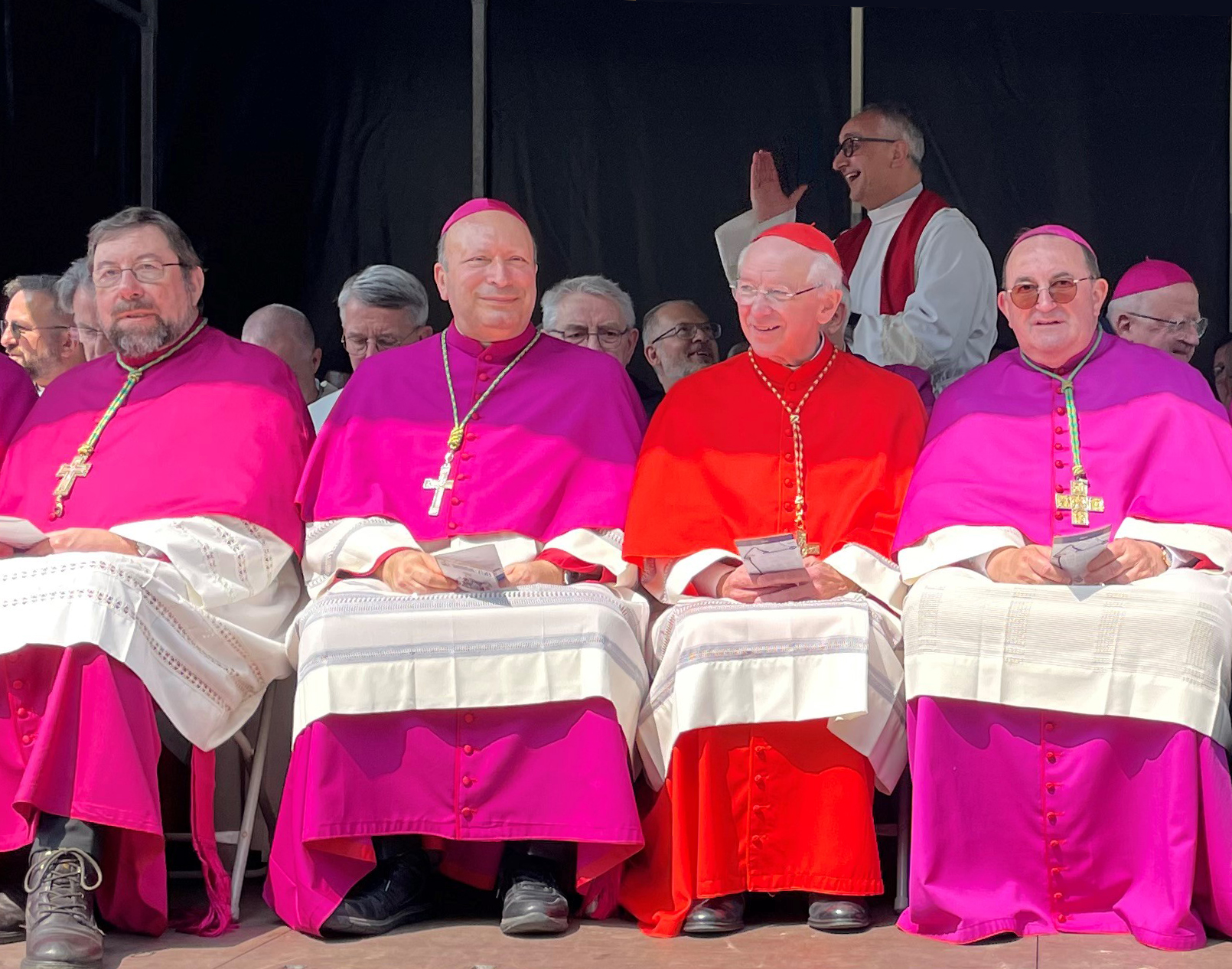
A cardinal, a nuncio and two bishops in Belgium.

A prelate (/ˈprɛlət/) is a high-ranking member of the Christian clergy who is an ordinary or who ranks in precedence with ordinaries. The word derives from the Latin praelatus, the past participle of praeferre, which means 'carry before', 'be set above or over' or 'prefer'; hence, a prelate is one set over others.

The archetypal prelate is a bishop, whose prelature is his particular church. All other prelates, including the regular prelates such as abbots and major superiors, are based upon this original model of prelacy.

== Related terminology ==
In a general sense, a "prelate" in the Catholic Church and other Christian churches is a bishop or other ecclesiastical person who possesses ordinary authority of a jurisdiction, i.e., of a diocese or similar jurisdiction, e.g., ordinariates, apostolic vicariates/exarchates, or territorial abbacies. It equally applies to cardinals, who enjoy a kind of "co-governance" of the church as the most senior ecclesiastical advisers and moral representatives of the Supreme Pontiff, and certain "superior prelates of the offices of the Roman Curia" who are not bishops, e.g., the auditors (judges) of the Roman Rota and protonotaries apostolic. By extension, it refers to "inferior" or "lesser prelates", that is priests who have the title and dress of prelates as a personal honorific, i.e., Papal chaplains, prelates of honor (formerly "domestic prelates"), and honorary protonotaries apostolic. All these enjoy the title of monsignor, which also is used in some nations for bishops and archbishops. The seven de numero protonotaries apostolic in Rome, who are special Papal notaries, are true prelates like bishops; others are "supernumerary" protonotaries apostolic who enjoy this as an honorific, like Papal chaplains and prelates of honor.

In the strict canonical sense, "prelate" denominates a priest or bishop who is ordinary of a personal prelature (see below), which is a functional equivalent of a diocese that has a "particular pastoral or missionary work for various regions or for different social groups" (cf. Code of Canon Law, Canon 294) yet no territorial jurisdiction.

In the Armenian Apostolic Church, "prelate" (in English) denominates a diocesan bishop, whose jurisdiction of his diocese is denominated a "prelacy".

== Territorial prelatures ==
In the Catholic Church, a territorial prelate is a prelate whose geographic jurisdiction, denominated a "territorial prelature", is outside of and therefore not subject to any diocese. A territorial prelate is sometimes denominated a "prelate nullius", from the Latin "nullius diœceseos" (prelate of no diocese), denoting that his territory is directly subject to the Holy See (the Supreme Pontiff) and is not a diocese. As of 2013, there were 44 territorial prelatures, all of which were in the Latin Church.

The term also is used generically, in which case it may equally refer to an apostolic prefecture, an apostolic vicariate, or a territorial abbacy.

== Personal prelatures ==
In the Catholic Church, the personal prelature was conceived during the Second Vatican Council (1962–65) in no. 10 of the decree Presbyterorum ordinis and Pope Paul VI later enacted it into law in the motu proprio Ecclesiae sanctae. The institution was later reaffirmed in the Code of Canon Law of 1983. Such a prelature is an institution having clergy and, possibly, lay members which would execute specific pastoral activities. The adjective "personal" refers to the fact that in contrast with previous canonical use for ecclesiastical institutions, the jurisdiction of the prelate is not territorial and instead is of specific persons wherever they are located. The establishment of personal prelatures is an exercise of the theologically inherent power of self-organization which the Church has to pursue its mission, though a personal prelature is not a particular church, as are dioceses and military ordinariates.

Personal prelatures are fundamentally secular organizations operating in the world (members do not take vows and live normal lives), whereas religious institutes are religious organizations operating out of the world (members take vows and live by the proper law of their institute).

The first, and presently only, personal prelature is Opus Dei, which Pope John Paul II erected as such in 1982 by the Apostolic constitution Ut sit. In the case of Opus Dei, the Prelate is elected by members of the Prelature and confirmed by the Supreme Pontiff; the laity and clergy of the Prelature remain subject to the government of the particular churches in whose territory they live, and the laity associated with the Prelature, both men and women, are organically united under the jurisdiction of the Prelate.

== Guidelines ==
On 15 February 2018, a motu proprio issued by Pope Francis ordered prelates and bishops to live simply and renounce any desire for power after they retired from senior offices of the Roman Curia. Several such officials and bishops had been criticized in the preceding years for luxurious living, such as having large apartments and police escorts after they retired. One notable incident involved Tarcisio Bertone, an Italian prelate and former Cardinal Secretary of State removed from office in 2013, who used an apartment that had been renovated at the cost of nearly half a million dollars in funds, which were diverted from a Vatican-owned hospital by the former president of the hospital. Even after he retired, Tarcisio Bertone used escorts of Vatican City and Italian police to move around Rome.

== See also ==
- Catholic Church hierarchy § Equivalents of diocesan bishops in law
- Ordinariate for Eastern Catholic faithful
- Personal ordinariate
