= Rudolf Müller (bishop) =

German Roman Catholic bishop

Coat of arms of Rudolf Müller

Rudolf Müller (24 June 1931 – 25 December 2012) was the Roman Catholic bishop of the Roman Catholic Diocese of Görlitz, Germany.

Ordained to the priesthood in 1955, Müller was named bishop in 1987 and retired in 2006.
