= Ordinariate =

Pre- or pseudo-diocesan ecclesiastical structure

In the organisation of the Catholic Church and of the Anglican Communion an ordinariate is a pre- or pseudo-diocesan ecclesiastical structure, of geographical or personal nature, headed by an ordinary who is not necessarily a bishop.

An ordinariate can be:

- an ordinariate for Eastern Catholic faithful in one or more countries (for Catholics of Armenian or Byzantine rite, usually)
- a military ordinariate, for the troops of a nation
- a personal ordinariate, also known as an Anglican ordinariate (a Catholic jurisdiction for those of the Anglican patrimony)
- a missionary jurisdiction, the Eastern Catholic equivalent of an apostolic prefecture, e.g. the former Ordinariate of Asmara
- the diocesan curia (in German use [Ordinariat], cf. English chancery)
- an ordinariate for an academic community, notably the former Ordinariate for foreign students in Belgium

== See also ==
- List of Catholic dioceses (structured view)
