= Joseph Kreutzinger =

Austrian painter and engraver (1757–1829)

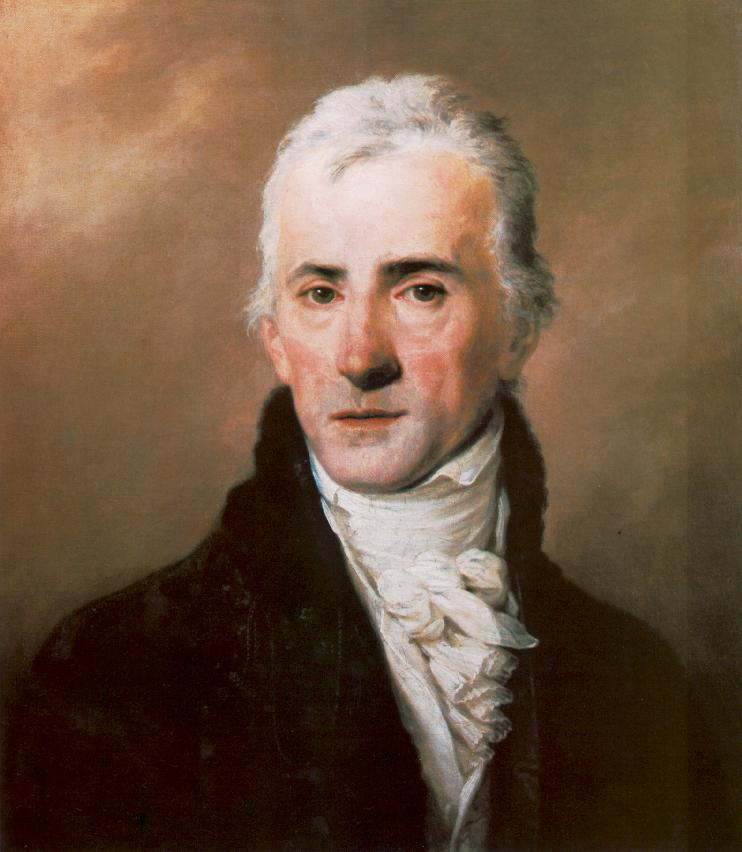
Joseph Kreutzinger, Ferenc Kazinczy, 1808

Joseph Kreutzinger (10 January 1757 – 14 July 1829) was an Austrian painter and engraver.

Kreutzinger was born in Vienna. He was a pupil of the Vienna Academy of Fine Arts and specialized in portraits. Kreutzinger was later appointed Imperial Royal Court Painter. He died in Vienna in 1829.

== Selected works ==
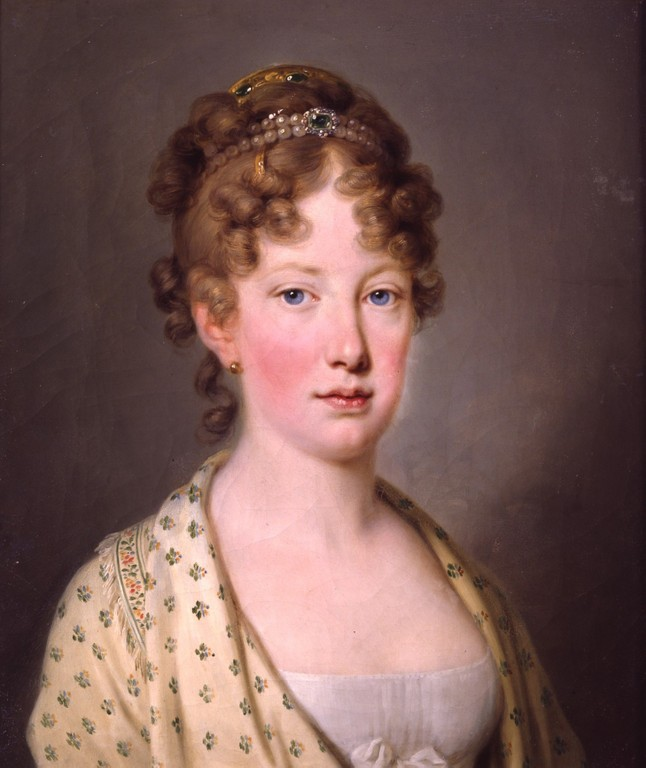
Portrait of Maria Leopoldina of Austria (1815), Schönbrunn Palace

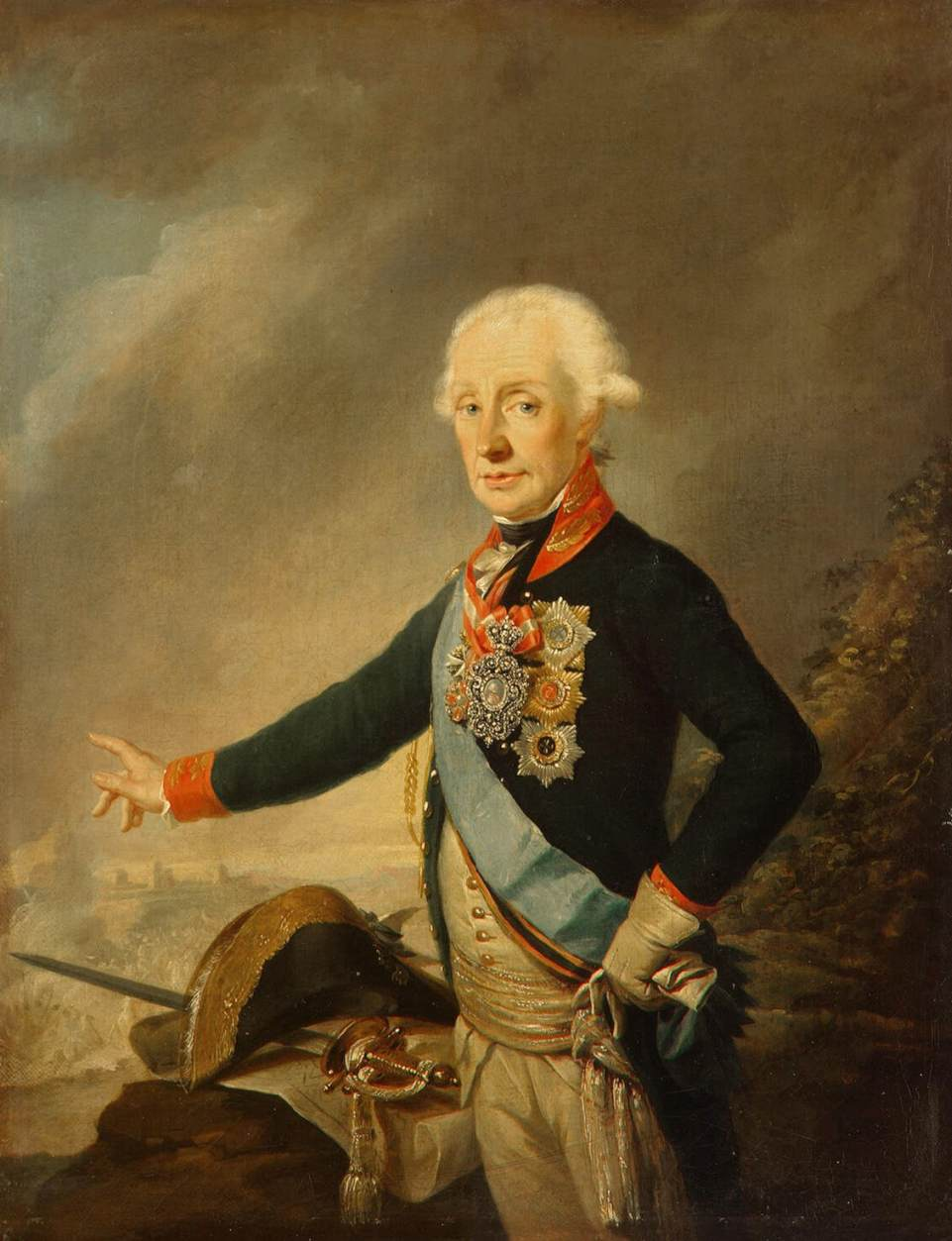
Portrait of Alexander Suvorov (1799), Hermitage Museum

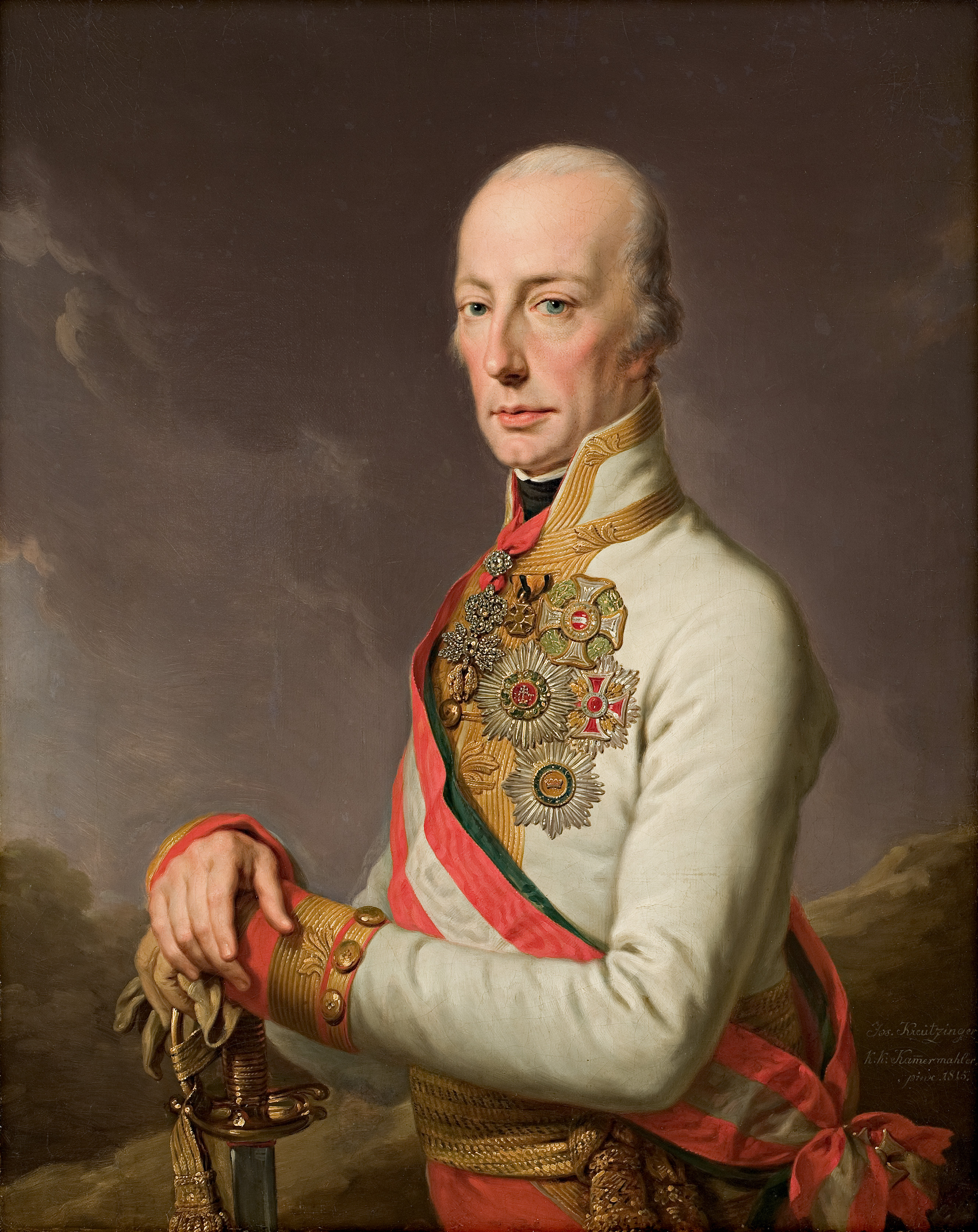
Portrait of Francis II of Austria (1815)

== Sources ==
- "Kreutzinger, Joseph". Benezit Dictionary of Artists. 2011.
