= Anna of Mecklenburg-Schwerin =

Landgravine of Hesse (1485–1525)

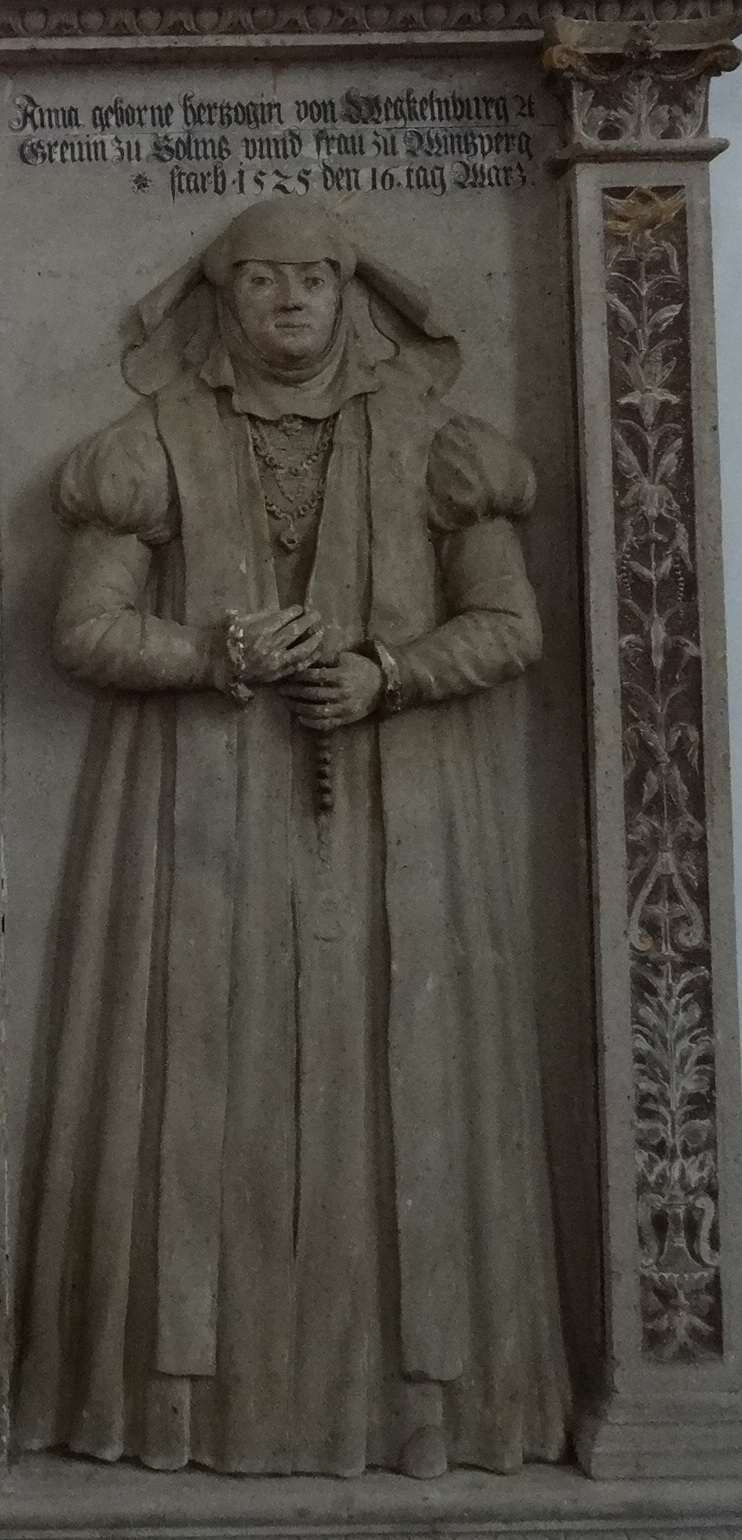
- Memorial at Marienstiftskirche, Lich
- Born: 14 September 1485; Plau am See
- Died: 12 May 1525 (aged 39); Rödelheim
- Spouse: William II of Hesse; Otto of Solms-Laubach
- Issue Detail: Elisabeth; Philip I, Landgrave of Hesse
- Father: Magnus II of Mecklenburg
- Mother: Sophie of Pomerania-Stettin

Anna, Princess of Mecklenburg-Schwerin (14 September 1485, Plau am See – 12 May 1525, Rödelheim) was a Landgravine of Hesse by marriage to William II of Hesse. She was appointed regent in the guardian regency during the minority of her son Philip I, Landgrave of Hesse in 1509-1519.

== Life ==
She was a daughter of Duke Magnus II of Mecklenburg (1441–1503), and Sophie of Pomerania-Stettin (about 1460 – 1504). She was a member of the 13th Generation of the Princely House of Mecklenburg.

In 1500, Anna married William II of Hesse (1469–1509). She was his second wife. Due to the early death of the ruler of Upper Hesse, William III (1471–1500), and the insanity of the Regent of Lower Hesse, William I (1466–1515), all of Hesse, including the county of Katzenelnbogen, was reunited in 1500 under William II. But Wilhelm II fell ill in 1504 – probably syphilis – and was incapable of governing in the following years.

In his first will (dated 1506), he appointed a Council of five guardians for his children Elisabeth (1502–1557) and Philip I (1504–1567) as well as his brother William I, his brother's wife Anna of Brunswick, and for his own wife. In his second testament (dated 1508), he determined, however, that Anna would be guardian (next to his uncle, Hermann of Cologne, who died in September 1508) and appointed two counselors to assist her.

In 1509, Wilhelm II died. However, Anna's claim to the regency was not recognized by the Estates of the Landgraviate of Hesse, nor by Saxony. In July 1509 there was a debate between Anna and the Hessian Estates, who were supported by the Saxon dukes. The second will was not recognized. During this period Anna lived at her Wittum in Gießen with her daughter Elisabeth, while her son Philip remained in Kassel under the supervision of Ludwig von Boyneburg to Lengsfeld. She was financially dependent on the Council and did not receive much money. This is evident among other things, an incident in 1512. In that year, Anna's sister Catherine married Duke Henry IV of Saxony. On this occasion, Anna wanted to introduce her daughter Elisabeth at the Saxon court, as she had been promised at a very early age to John, the eldest son of George the Bearded. Anna requested some damask for a proper dress from the council, but the request was denied. Anna then decided not to take her daughter to Dresden, because of her "shabby clothes".

Things changed in 1514. Anna came to power with the support of many nobles and cities. She was never officially recognized as a regent, but she ruled even past 1519, the year her son Philip was declared of age by Emperor Maximilian I.

Very little is known about the last years of her life. In 1519 she married a second time, with the 23-year-old Count Otto of Solms-Laubach, who died three years later.

== Offspring ==
Anna first married on 20 October 1500 in Kassel the Landgrave William II of Hesse (1469–1509) with whom she had the following children:

- Elisabeth (1502–1557)
- Magdalena (1503–1504)
- Philip I (1504–1567)

On 7 September 1519 she married Count Otto of Solms-Laubach (1496–1522), a second marriage:

- Maria (1520–1522)
- Frederick Magnus I (1521–1561)
- Anna (1522–1594)

== Importance ==
"The historian has to give the landgravine a prominent place in the Hessian history", historian Hans Glagau wrote in 1899. Landgravine Anna of Hesse, born Duchess of Mecklenburg, would be worthy of a historical-critical biography. So far, however, an adequate representation of personality and life of the landgravine has not emerged.

Anna of Hesse's life is interesting from the point of view of theological history, because she directly influenced the time before the introduction of the Reformation in Hesse by Philip I in 1527. Her husband had ordered reforms in all monasteries in Hesse in his will. Anna tried to implement these reforms in some places, but the reforms only succeeded during Philip's rule, albeit he implemented them in his own way. It would seem very important for church historians to investigate Anna's influence on church policies and the church in Hesse in the Reformation in Hesse and elsewhere. She herself has worked tirelessly for the monasteries and Catholicism, causing a discord with her son.

The topic is important in a broader perspective, because it is about a period in the history of Hesse that hasn't been studied much in the past: the late Middle Ages, just before the Reformation, from the perspective of a prominent female regent. The chaotic conditions in Hesse during the years 1509–1518 were caused by the fact that no legitimate ruler was available, and power had to be exercised by a woman.

Also interesting in this context is the political delicacy of the conflicts between different interest groups: the Estates, Anna and Philip, the advisors appointed by William's will, the emperor and the princes of Saxony.
