= Frederick of Saxony =

Frederick of Saxony may refer to:

- Frederick I, Elector of Saxony, or Frederick the Belligerent (1370–1428), ruler of Saxony from 1422 to 1428
- Frederick II, Elector of Saxony, or Frederick the Gentle (1412–1464), ruler of Saxony from 1428 to 1464
- Frederick III, Elector of Saxony, or Frederick the Wise (1463–1525), ruler of Saxony from 1486 to 1525, protector of Martin Luther
- Duke Frederick of Saxony (1474–1510), Grand Master of the Teutonic Knights
- Frederick, Hereditary Prince of Saxony (1504–1539), son of George, Duke of Saxony
- Frederick August I, Elector of Saxony, or Augustus II the Strong (1670–1733), ruler of Saxony from 1694 to 1733
- Frederick August II, Elector of Saxony, or Augustus III of Poland (1696–1763), ruler of Saxony from 1733 to 1763
- Frederick Christian, Elector of Saxony (1722–1763), ruler of Saxony for 74 days in 1763
- Frederick Augustus I of Saxony (1750–1827), ruler of Saxony as elector and king from 1763 to 1827
- Frederick Augustus II of Saxony (1797–1854), King of Saxony from 1836 to 1854
- Frederick Augustus III of Saxony (1865–1932), King of Saxony from 1904 to 1918
