= Barbara Jagiellon =

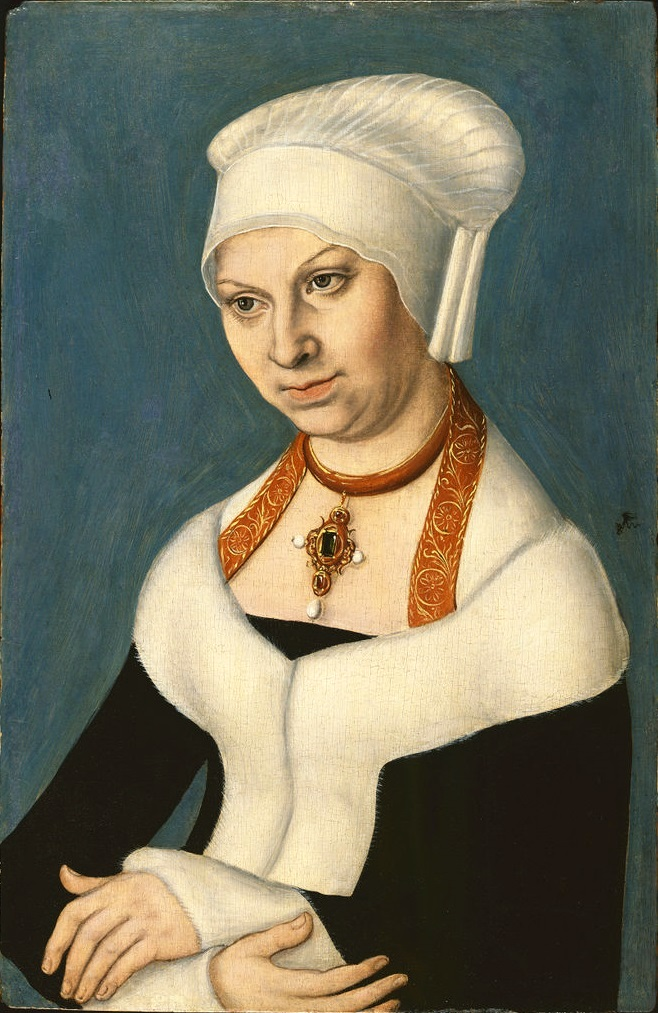
- Portrait by Lucas Cranach the Elder

Duchess consort of Saxony Margravine consort of Meissen
- Tenure: 12 September 1500 – 15 February 1534
- Born: 15 July 1478; Sandomierz
- Died: 15 February 1534 (aged 55); Leipzig
- Spouse: George, Duke of Saxony (m. 1496)
- Issue More...: John, Hereditary Prince of Saxony; Frederick, Hereditary Prince of Saxony; Christine, Landgravine of Hesse; Magdalena, Electoral Princess of Brandeburg
- House: Jagiellon (by birth); Wettin (Albertine Line) (by marriage)
- Father: Casimir IV Jagiellon
- Mother: Elizabeth of Austria

Barbara Jagiellon (Polish: Barbara Jagiellonka, Lithuanian: Barbora Jogailaitė; 15 July 1478 – 15 February 1534) was a princess of the Kingdom of Poland and of the Grand Duchy of Lithuania, member of the Jagiellonian dynasty and by marriage Duchess of Saxony.

Born in Sandomierz, she was the sixth daughter of King Casimir IV of Poland and Archduchess Elisabeth of Austria. She was named after her great-grandmother, Barbara of Cilli, Holy Roman Empress.

== Life ==
Barbara was married on 21 November 1496 in a glittering ceremony in Leipzig to George, Duke of Saxony (1471–1539). At the wedding, 6,286 German and Polish nobles were said to be present. This marriage was a key part of maintaining good diplomatic relations between Germany and Poland. For Barbara's family, the marriage was also important due to their rivalry with the House of Habsburg.

In 1513, Barbara and her husband founded Meissen Cathedral; several Masses and liturgical celebration of Easter have been recorded to have taken place since then. Barbara sent letters to her husband while he was at battles. Witnesses say the couple had a very loving and happy marriage.

Barbara died in Leipzig aged 55. Her husband was so stricken by grief that he grew a beard during this time, which was why he was nicknamed "the Bearded". She was buried in the cathedral of Meissen in her husband's funeral chapel, built between 1521 and 1524. Barbara and George were the last Prince and Princess of the House of Wettin to be buried at the cathedral. The altarpiece in the funerary chapel was the work of Lucas Cranach the Elder. They are surrounded by apostles and saints.

== Issue ==
1. Christoph of Saxony (8 September 1497 – 5 December 1497).
2. Johann of Saxony (24 August 1498 – 11 January 1537); married on 20 May 1516 to Elisabeth of Hesse. This union was childless.
3. Wolfgang of Saxony (1499 – 12 January 1500).
4. Anna of Saxony (21 January 1500 – 23 January 1500).
5. Christoph of Saxony (born and died 27 May 1501).
6. Agnes of Saxony (7 January 1503 – 16 April 1503).
7. Frederick of Saxony (15 March 1504 – 26 February 1539); married on 27 January 1539 to Elisabeth of Mansfeld. This union was childless.
8. Christine of Saxony (25 December 1505 – 15 April 1549); married on 11 December 1523 to Philip I, Landgrave of Hesse.
9. Magdalena of Saxony (7 March 1507 – 25 January 1534); married on 6 November 1524 to Joachim Hector, then Electoral Prince of Brandenburg.
10. Margarethe of Saxony (7 September 1508 – d. Dresden, 19 December 1510).

== Ancestry ==
Ancestors of Barbara Jagiellon

16. Gediminas of Lithuania
8. Algirdas, King of Lithuania
17. Jewna of Polotsk
4. Władysław II Jagiełło, King of Poland
18. Alexander I, Grand Prince of Tver
9. Uliana Alexandrovna of Tver
19. Anastasia Yuryevna of Halych
2. Casimir IV Jagiellon, King of Poland
20. Ivan Olgimuntovich, Prince of Halshany
10. Andrew Ivanovich, Prince of Halshany
21. Agrippina
5. Sophia of Halshany
22. Dimitri of Drutsk (possibly Demetrius I Starshy)
11. Alexandra Dimitrijewna of Drutsk
1. Barbara of Poland
24. Albert III, Duke of Austria
12. Albert IV, Duke of Austria
25. Beatrice of Hohenzollern-Nuremberg
6. Albert II of Germany
26. Albert I, Duke of Bavaria
13. Johanna Sophia of Bavaria
27. Margaret of Brieg
3. Elizabeth of Austria
28. Charles IV, Holy Roman Emperor
14. Sigismund, Holy Roman Emperor
29. Elizabeth of Pomerania
7. Elizabeth of Luxembourg
30. Hermann II of Celje
15. Barbara of Celje
31. Anna, Countess of Schaunberg

== Bibliography ==
- Z. Wdowiszewski: Genealogia Jagiellonów i Domu Wazów w Polsce, Avalon, Kraków 2005, pp. 131–132 and genealogical table in p. 210.

Barbara Jagiellon House of Jagiellon Cadet branch of the House of Gediminas Born: 15 July 1478 Died: 15 February 1534
German royalty
Preceded by Sidonie Podiebrad of Bohemia	Duchess consort of Saxony; Margravine consort of Meissen; 12 September 1500 – 15 February 1534	Vacant Title next held by Katharina of Mecklenburg-Schwerin
