= Elisabeth of Hesse, Hereditary Princess of Saxony =

Saxon princess (1502–1557)

Elisabeth of Hesse
- Hereditary Princess of Saxony
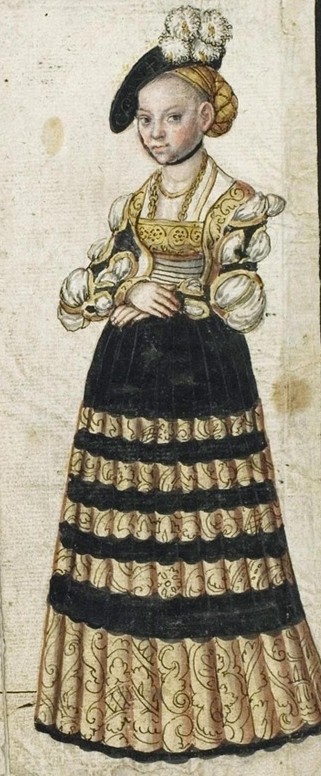
- Born: 4 March 1502; Marburg
- Died: 6 December 1557 (aged 55); Schmalkalden
- Spouse: John of Saxony (m. 1519)
- House: House of Hesse
- Father: William II of Hesse
- Mother: Anna of Mecklenburg-Schwerin

Elisabeth of Hesse (4 March 1502 – 6 December 1557) was Hereditary Princess of Saxony in 1519-1537 by marriage to John of Saxony. After the death of her husband, she managed her Wittum (estates that were assigned to her upon marriage), the Saxon districts of Rochlitz and Kriebstein between 1537 and 1547, earning her the name Elisabeth of Rochlitz. She allowed for the spread of Protestantism in her territories. She acted as mediator between her Catholic mother and Lutheran brother, and as the nurse of Maurice of Saxony.

== Early life ==
Elisabeth of Hesse was born on 4 March 1502. Her childhood was marked by the struggles of her mother Anna of Mecklenburg-Schwerin against the Hessian nobility. After the death of her father, William II of Hesse in 1509, in violation of the instructions in his testament, they formed a five-member council, chaired by the steward Ludwig von Boyneburg of Lengsfeld. This Council took over the government on behalf of Elisabeth's brother Philip I, and took Anna and her children under guardianship.

During this period Elisabeth lived with her mother in Gießen, while her brother remained in Kassel under the supervision of Ludwig von Boyneburg of Lengsfeld.

Elisabeth and her mother were financially dependent on the council, who kept them short of money, a fact that was highlighted in 1512. Anna's sister Catherine had married Henry IV of Saxony, and Anna wanted to present Elisabeth at the Saxon court, as she had been promised at a very early age to John, the eldest son of George Duke of Saxony. When Anna requested money to purchase some damask for a dress suitable for court, the request was denied, and the visit then had to be cancelled.

In 1514 Anna regained the regency of Hesse. Guardianship of the children was returned to her, although on matters of state she had to consult with an advisory board. The family were reunited and lived together in Kassel.

== Hereditary Princess of Saxony ==
The betrothal contract between Elisabeth and John took place on 8 March 1515, after the Pope issued a dispensation as the couple were related in the fourth degree. In 1516 John came to Marburg, where the nuptials took place, but it was not until January 1519 that Elisabeth began to live permanently at court in Dresden. The marriage took place on 7 June 1519 in Kassel.

In Dresden she constantly fought for her independence against Duke George the Bearded and his court officials. Her new husband, the ever-ailing John, did not get along with his overbearing father either. The couple had no children and the pressure at court led Elisabeth to chronic insomnia. During this period she showed her diplomatic skills, restoring the peace between her brother and their mother when Anna wanted to remarry against Philip's objections. Elisabeth mediated again when there was tension between the two regarding matters of religion (her mother held the Catholic faith, her brother favoured Lutheranism). During this period, she also acted as a nurse for Maurice of Saxony.

== Rochlitz and Schmalkalden ==
When John died on 11 January 1537, Elisabeth moved to Rochlitz, a district she had received as Wittum when she married. The Saxon court, however, did not grant her her own budget, putting her in the same situation as her mother. She managed to avoid this, with the help of her brother. She received the district of Rochlitz (this included the town of Rochlitz, Rochlitz Castle, Mittweida and Geithain) and the Kriebstein district (including Waldheim and Hartha). Consequently, she is referred to by the name "of Rochlitz". In Rochlitz, Elisabeth brought up Barbara of Hesse, the daughter of her brother.

Elisabeth allowed the Lutheran doctrine in her territory from 1537 onwards, while the rest of Saxony, under her father in law, still adhered to Catholicism. Her brother sent the Protestant preacher Johann Schütz to her and she also joined the Schmalkaldic League in the summer of 1538. She later acted as advisor to Duke Maurice of Saxony when he inherited from his father. In 1540, she exposed the secret bigamy of her brother, Phillip.

After the defeat of the Schmalkalden League, Elisabeth left Rochlitz; her brother gave her the Hessian part of Schmalkalden. She lived here from 1547 at court in Hesse. Her brother fell into imperial captivity, and his wife, Christine of Saxony (1505–1549) took steps to get him released. During this time, Elizabeth was often in Kassel, in order to supervise the education of Philip's children. In 1556 Elisabeth fell seriously ill, after which her brother set up the first pharmacy in Schmalkalden. She died there on 6 December 1557 and was buried in St. Elisabeth's Church in Marburg, one of the last Landgrave burials there.

== Sources ==
- Joan Elizabeth Wigand, History of the Regent of Hesse-Cassel (page 37 to 39), Cassel, 1882, facsimile edition Past Edition Dieter Carl, Vellmar 2001, ISBN 3-9807814-0-2
- Elisabeth Werl, Duchess Elizabeth of Saxony (1502-1557) as sister of Landgraf Philipps the Great of Hesse, Hessisches Yearbook of National History 7 (1957), p. 199-229.
- Pauline Puppel, Elisabeth of Rochlitz, in: Landgrave Philip the Magnanimous 1504-1567. Hessen in the heart of the reform, companion volume to an exhibition of Hesse, ed. Ursula Braasch-Schwersmann, Hans Schneider and William E. Winterhager, Marburg/Neustadt an der Aisch, 2004, p. 192-193.
