= Henry the Pious =

Henry the Pious may refer to:

- Henry III, Holy Roman Emperor (1017–56)
- Henry II the Pious, Duke of Wrocław (1196/1207–1241) and High Duke of Poland (1238–1241)
- Henry IV, Duke of Saxony (1473–1541)
