= Portraits of Henry IV of Saxony and Catherine of Mecklenburg =

Paintings by Lucas Cranach the Elder

Portrait of Henry IV of Saxony and Catherine of Mecklenburg
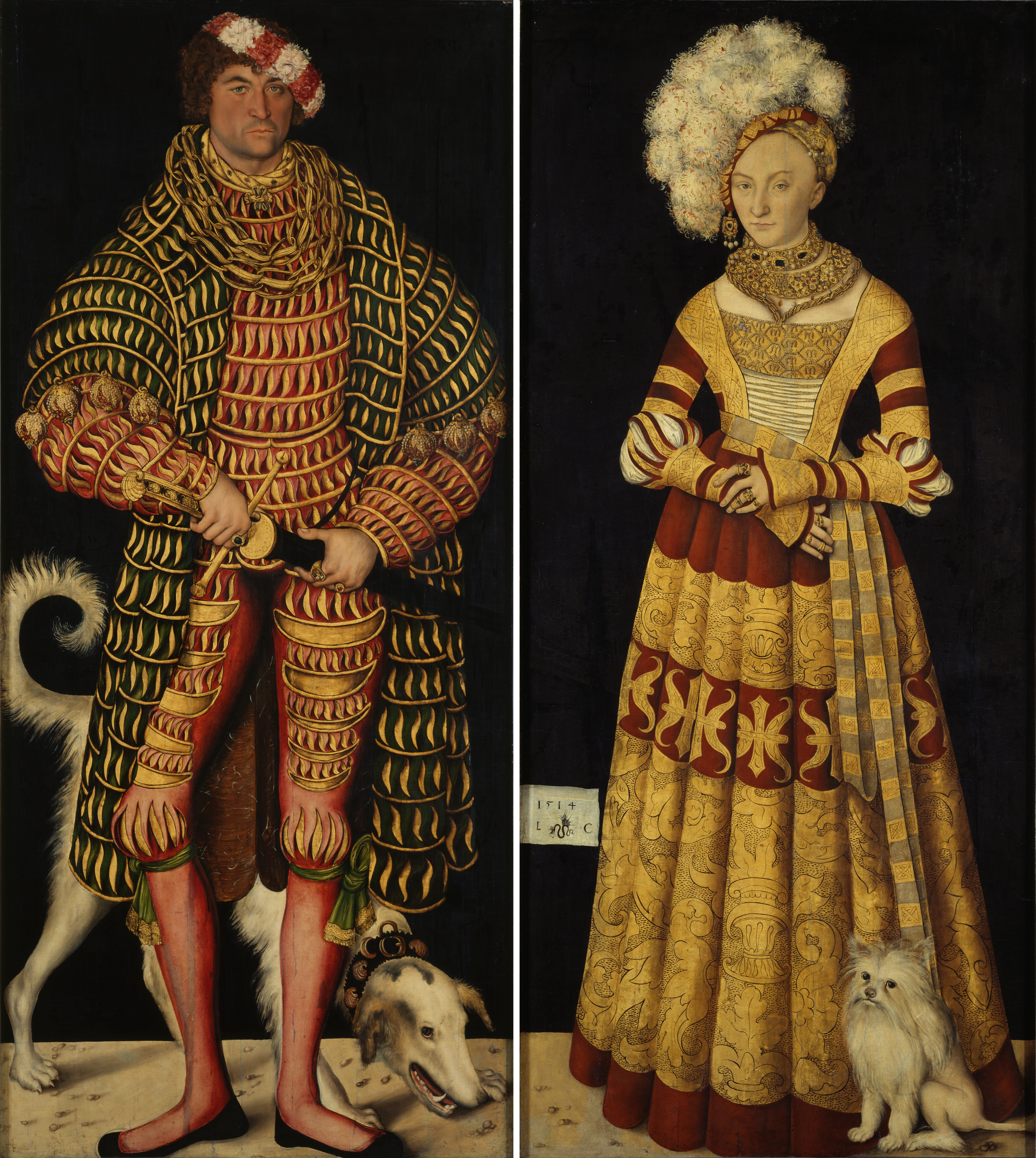
- Artist: Lucas Cranach the Elder and workshop
- Year: 1514
- Medium: Oil on panel
- Dimensions: 184.5 cm × 82.5 cm (72.6 in × 32.5 in)
- Location: Gemäldegalerie Alte Meister, Dresden

The Portrait of Henry IV of Saxony and Catherine of Mecklenburg are a matching pair of full-length portrait paintings by the German Renaissance master Lucas Cranach the Elder, dating from 1514, now in the Gemäldegalerie Alte Meister, Dresden, Germany.

The work was Cranach's first official portrait, and depicts Henry IV, Duke of Saxony and his wife Catherine of Mecklenburg at about life-size. They are among the earliest northern full-length portraits. Both wear lavishly decorated clothes and decorations recalling their families' coat of arms.

Henry, painted with his hunting dog, is portrayed in the act of drawing his sword. Catherine's panel contains a cartouche with Cranach's initials, the year of execution and a winged snake, the symbol of the painter's workshop.

== Sources ==
- Zuffi, Stefano (2005). Il Cinquecento. Milan: Electa. ISBN 88-370-3468-7.
