= Severinus of Saxony =

Prince of Saxony (1522–1533)

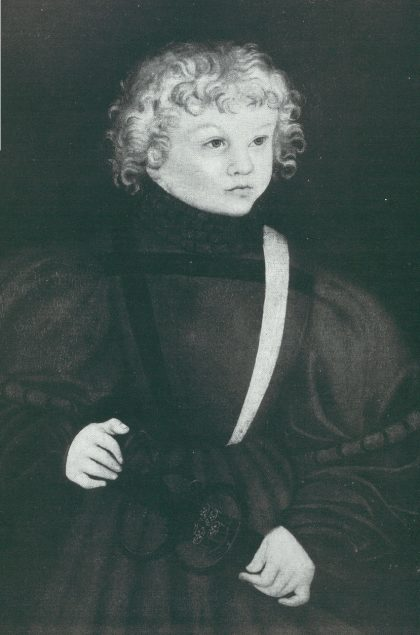
- Prince Severinus of Saxony, painting by Lucas Cranach the Elder, 1526
- Born: 28 August 1522; Freiberg
- Died: 10 October 1533 (aged 11); Innsbruck
- Buried: Cistercian abbey in Stams
- Noble family: House of Wettin
- Father: Henry IV, Duke of Saxony
- Mother: Catherine of Mecklenburg

Severinus of Saxony (German: Severinus von Sachsen; 28 August 1522, Freiberg – 10 October 1533, Innsbruck) was a Saxon prince of the Albertine line of the House of Wettin.

== Life ==
Severinus was the second son of the Duke Henry of Saxony (1473–1541) from his marriage to Catherine (1487–1561), daughter of Duke Magnus II of Mecklenburg. His mother and the educator Balthasar Rysche had a significant influence on the education of Severinus and his older brother Maurice.

When his uncle George the Bearded visited, he would organize a fight between Severinus and his older brother Maurice. Despite his frail health, Severinus always had upper hand in such fights. This gave their father the idea that Maurice was better perhaps suited for an ecclesiastical career.

At the behest of their Catholic uncle George, Duke Severinus was separated from his Lutheran parents and sent to Innsbruck to receive a Catholic education. In Innsbruck, he stayed at the court of the future emperor Ferdinand I and his wife Anna. He was raised together with their children. He had Bernhard von Rathschitz as his own private tutor. He was buried in the Cistercian abbey in Stams. His tomb was looted and destroyed in 1552 by the troops of his own brother Maurice during the Schmalkaldic War.

== Legacy ==
In 1526, Lucas Cranach the Elder made two portraits of the young Princes Maurice and Severinus. The painting of Severinus was created with tempera on wood and measures 57 x 38.5 cm. It is considered an excellent and safe work by Cranach and was included in the overall list of nationally valuable cultural heritage. It is owned by the House of Hesse Foundation and was on loan to the Portland Art Museum between 2005 and 2006.

== Ancestors ==
Ancestors of Severinus of Saxony

16. Frederick I, Elector of Saxony (1370–1428)
8. Frederick II, Elector of Saxony (1412–1464)
17. Catherine of Brunswick-Lüneburg (1395–1442)
4. Duke Albert the Bold (1443–1500)
18. Ernest "the Iron" of Austria (1377–1424)
9. Margaret of Austria-Styria (1416–1486)
19. Cimburgis of Masovia (1394/97–1429)
2. Henry the Pious (1473–1541)
20. Victor of Kunštát and Poděbrady (1403–1427)
10. King George of Poděbrady (1420–1471)
21. Anna of Wartenberg (1403–1427)
5. Sidonie of Poděbrady (1449–1510)
22. Lord Smil of Sternberg (d. 1431)
11. Kunigunde of Sternberg (1425–1449)
23. Barbara of Pardubitz (d. 1433)
1. Severinus of Saxony
24. John IV, Duke of Mecklenburg (1370–1422)
12. Henry IV, Duke of Mecklenburg (1417–1477)
25. Catherine of Saxe-Lauenburg (d. 1448)
6. Magnus II, Duke of Mecklenburg (1441–1503)
26. Frederick I, Elector of Brandenburg (1371–1440)
13. Dorothea of Brandenburg (1420–1491)
27. Elisabeth of Bavaria (1383–1442)
3. Catherine of Mecklenburg (1487–1561)
28. Wartislaw IX, Duke of Pomerania (1400–1457)
14. Eric II, Duke of Pomerania (1425–1474)
29. Sophia of Saxe-Lauenburg (d. 1462)
7. Sophie of Pomerania (1460–1504)
30. Bogislav IX of Pomerania-Stolp (1407-1446)
15. Sophie of Pomerania-Stolp (1435-1497)
31. Maria of Masovia (1408-1454)

== References and sources ==
- Friedrich Albert von Langenn: Moritz, Herzog und Churfürst zu Sachsen: eine Darstellung aus dem …, Part 1, p. 51 ff.
- Eduard Machatschek: Geschichte des Königreichs Sachsen: Nach glaubewürdigen Quellen: Akten …, p. 301
- Joseph Hormayr zu Hortenburg: Die goldene Chronik von Hohenschwangau, der Burg der Welfen, der …, p. 77
- Theodor Distel: Ein untergegangenes sächsisches Fürstenmonument in Tirol aus der ersten Hälfte des sechzehnten Jahrhunderts. Mit dem Totenbilde des Herzogs Severin zu Sachsen, in: Mitteilungen des Vereins für Geschichte der Stadt Meissen, vol II, Meissen 1891, p. 405–409
- Julius Erbstein: Zwei unbekannte Knabenbildnisse Lukas Cranach’s des älteren, nach einer Medaille festgestellt, in: Münz- und Medaillenfreund vol. 1 issue. 5–7, 1899, pp. 33–36, 41–44, 49–53
- Max J. Friedländer, J. Rosenberg: Die Gemälde von Lucas Cranach, Basel, 1979
- Romedio Schmitz-Esser und Elena Taddei: Der Todesfall des Herzogs Severin von Sachsen in Tirol – Ein Obduktionsbericht des habsburgischen Hofarztes Georg Tannstätter von 1533, in: Virus 5, 2005, p. 9–21
- Romedio Schmitz-Esser and Robert Rebitsch: Herzog Severin von Sachsen. Aufenthalt und Tod eines jungen Sachsenherzogs in Tirol, in: Tiroler Heimat, issue 69, 2005, p. 121–142
- Ed. Heyck: Cranachstudien. K.W. Hiersemann, Leipzig, 1900, Digitized
