= Sidonie of Saxony =

- Duchess of Brunswick-Lüneburg; Princess of Calenberg-Göttingen
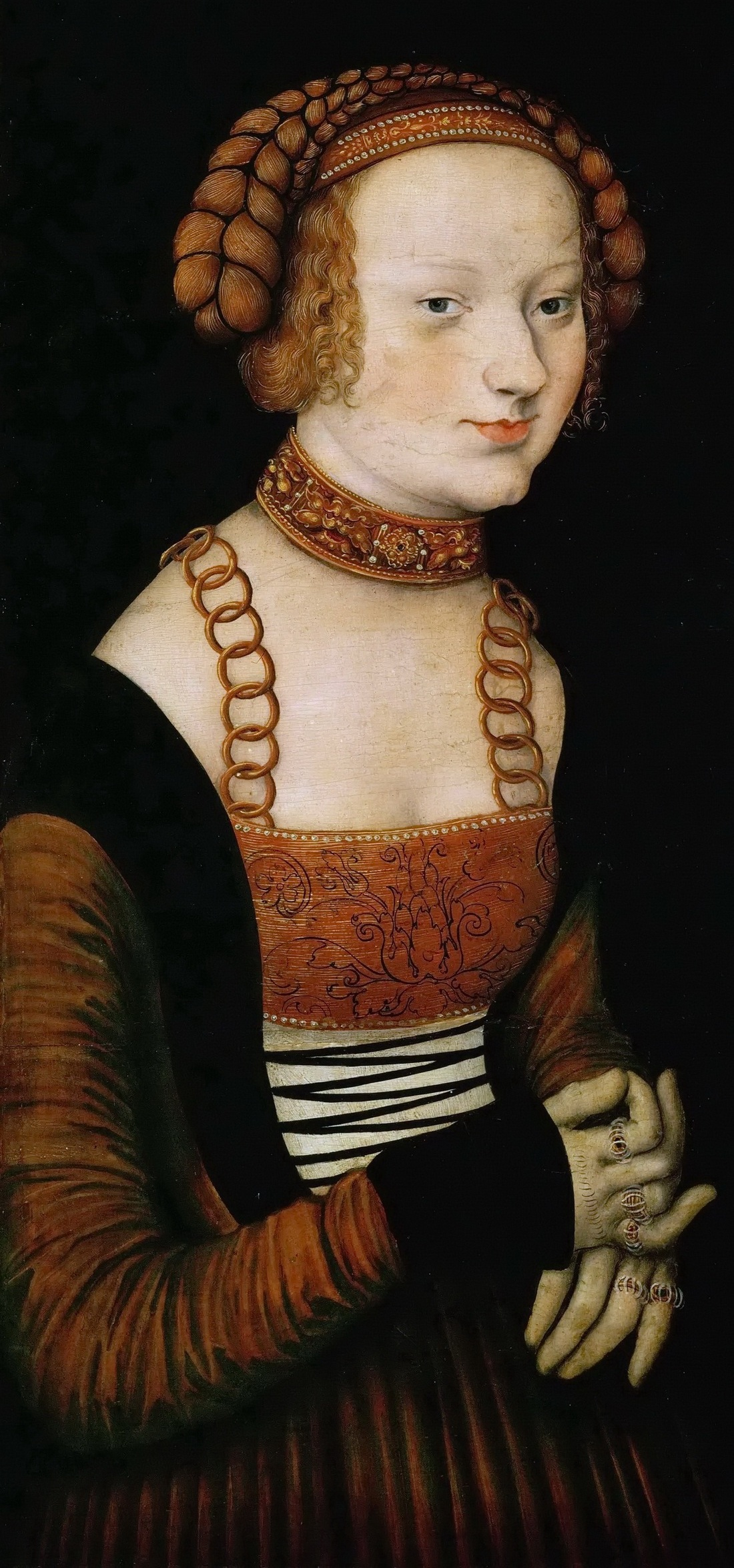
- Portrait by Lucas Cranach the Elder, 1535
- Tenure: 1545–1573
- Born: 8 March 1518; Meissen
- Died: 4 January 1575 (aged 56); Weißenfels
- Burial: Freiberg Cathedral
- Spouse: Eric II, Duke of Brunswick-Lüneburg
- House: Wettin
- Father: Henry IV, Duke of Saxony
- Mother: Catherine of Mecklenburg

Sidonie of Saxony (also: Sidonia; 8 March 1518, Meissen – 4 January 1575, Weißenfels) was a princess of the House of Wettin and by marriage Duchess of Brunswick-Lüneburg and Princess of Calenberg-Göttingen.

== Life ==
=== Family ===
Sidonie was the daughter of the Duke Henry IV of Saxony (1473–1541) from his marriage to Catherine (1487–1561), daughter of the Duke Magnus II of Mecklenburg. Her brothers were Elector Maurice of Saxony and August; her sister Sibylle was from 1540 by marriage Duchess of Saxe-Lauenburg; her sister Aemilia was from 1533 by marriage Margravine of Brandenburg-Ansbach.

=== Marriage ===
Sidonie married on 17 May 1545 Duke Eric II of Brunswick-Lüneburg (1528–1584), who was ten years her junior. The wedding ceremony was held in Hann. Münden without the usual pomp and circumstance.

Initially, they liked each other. Eric had been engaged to Agnes of Hesse. When the marriage was negotiated at the court in Kassel, however, he had met Sidonie. He liked her, and broke off the engagement with Agnes, in order to marry Sidonie. Landgrave Philip I of Hesse predicted: "All sorts of things will happen inside this marriage after the kissing month ends."

Two years into the marriage, in 1547, Duke Eric began his rule and reconverted to the Catholic faith, after the Reformation had been introduced to his Duchy in 1542. Despite her husband's pleas, Sidonie held on to her Lutheran faith. They had financial problems and the marriage remained childless, and soon their relationship took a very unfortunate course.

The clashes culminated in her suspicion that her husband wanted to poison her. A Genoese merchant had contacted Sidonie's brother Augustus in 1555 and informed him that Duke Eric I had ordered poison from him on the grounds that "Eric was a Christian and his wife would be Lutheran, it was better that one woman part was destroyed, than 20,000 people." Eric turned to a mistress with whom he lived at Calenberg Castle from 1563. Sidonie was refused access to the castle, which was also based on the grounds that she had threatened "if she comes into my house, I'll cut the whore's nose off and poke out an eye."

=== Charges of witchcraft ===
Sidonie was from 1564 onwards virtually under house arrest and she protested vigorously to her brother and to the Emperor, who sent councils who tried unsuccessfully to compromise with Duke Eric. In 1564 Eric fell very ill and suspected he was poisoned. Four women suspected of witchcraft were burned as witches in Neustadt am Rübenberge. In 1570 mediation by the Emperor, the Elector of Saxony and Duke Julius of Brunswick-Wolfenbüttel resulted in a settlement of the disputes between Sidonie and her husband, in which Sidonie would receive Calenberg Castle. Eric, however, did not abide by the settlement.

On 30 March 1572, Duke Eric assembled some of his advisers, nobles and deputies of the cities of Hannover and Hameln on Landestrost Castle in Neustadt. He accused Sidonie of witchcraft and of an attempt on his life. He presented evidence obtained by torture from the four women he had executed for witchcraft. Sidonie turned to Emperor Maximilian II and asked for a revision. She secretly left Kalenberg and traveled to Vienna. Emperor Maximilian then decreed that the investigation should be carried out at the imperial court. However, he then turned the case over to the Dukes Julius of Brunswick-Wolfenbüttel and William the Younger of Brunswick-Lüneburg.

On 17 December 1573 the case was presented in Halberstadt to the court and a large audience. All witnesses recanted their testimony against Sidonie and on 1 January 1574, the Duchess was acquitted of all charges.

=== Weißenfels Monastery ===
From Vienna, Sidonie traveled in October 1572 to Dresden to her brother and his wife. Instead of Calenberg castle and the silver Duke Eric had withheld from her, she received, after several settlements, compensation and a pension for life. Elector Augustus gave her the Poor Clares monastery at Weißenfels with all income and interest. Sidonie lived there until she died in 1575.

Due to Sidonie's resistance, Duke Julius of Brunswick did not succeed in amicably resolving Eric's accusation against Sidonie. In 1573, Sidonie wrote to duke Julius: Duke Eric's difficult because he spewed out accusations, taking, as we speak, not the clothes, but the honor, which is the highest and most precious treasure a poor woman in this world possesses.

According to her will Sidonie was buried in Freiberg Cathedral. She left significant sums of money to her negotiators in the Halberstadt trial.

== Sources ==
- Martin Schemel: Eine christliche Leichpredigte, vber der Leich der Durchleuchtigen Hochgebornen Fürstin vnd Frawn, Frawen Sidonien gebornen Hertzogin zu Sachsen, vnd Fürstin zu Braunschweig vnd Lüneburg, gethan zu Freibergk in der Thumkirchen. Durch M. Martinum Schemel Predigern zu Weissenfels etc. Schwertel, 1575.
