= Carl Schäfer =

German architect

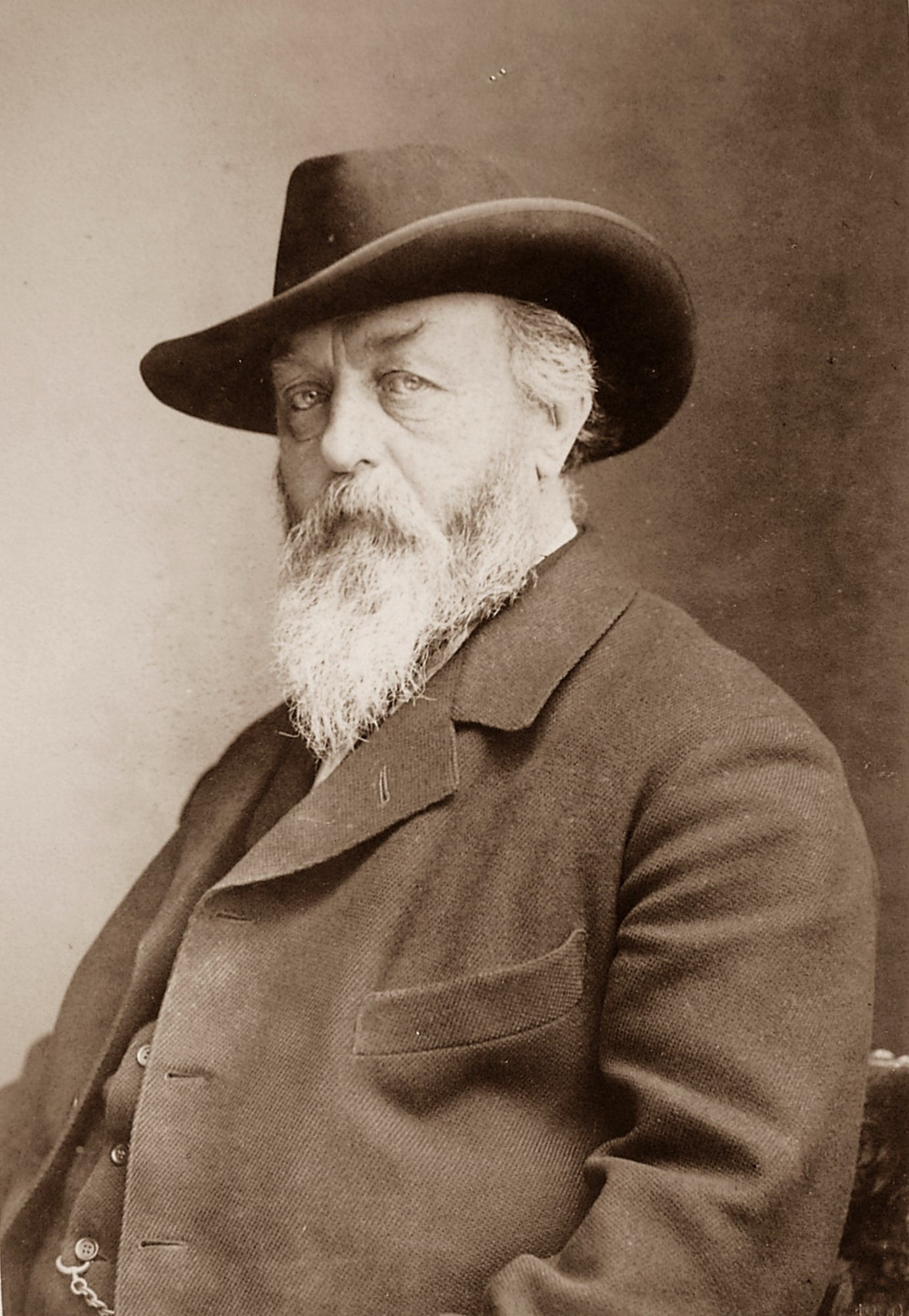
Schäfer in 1900

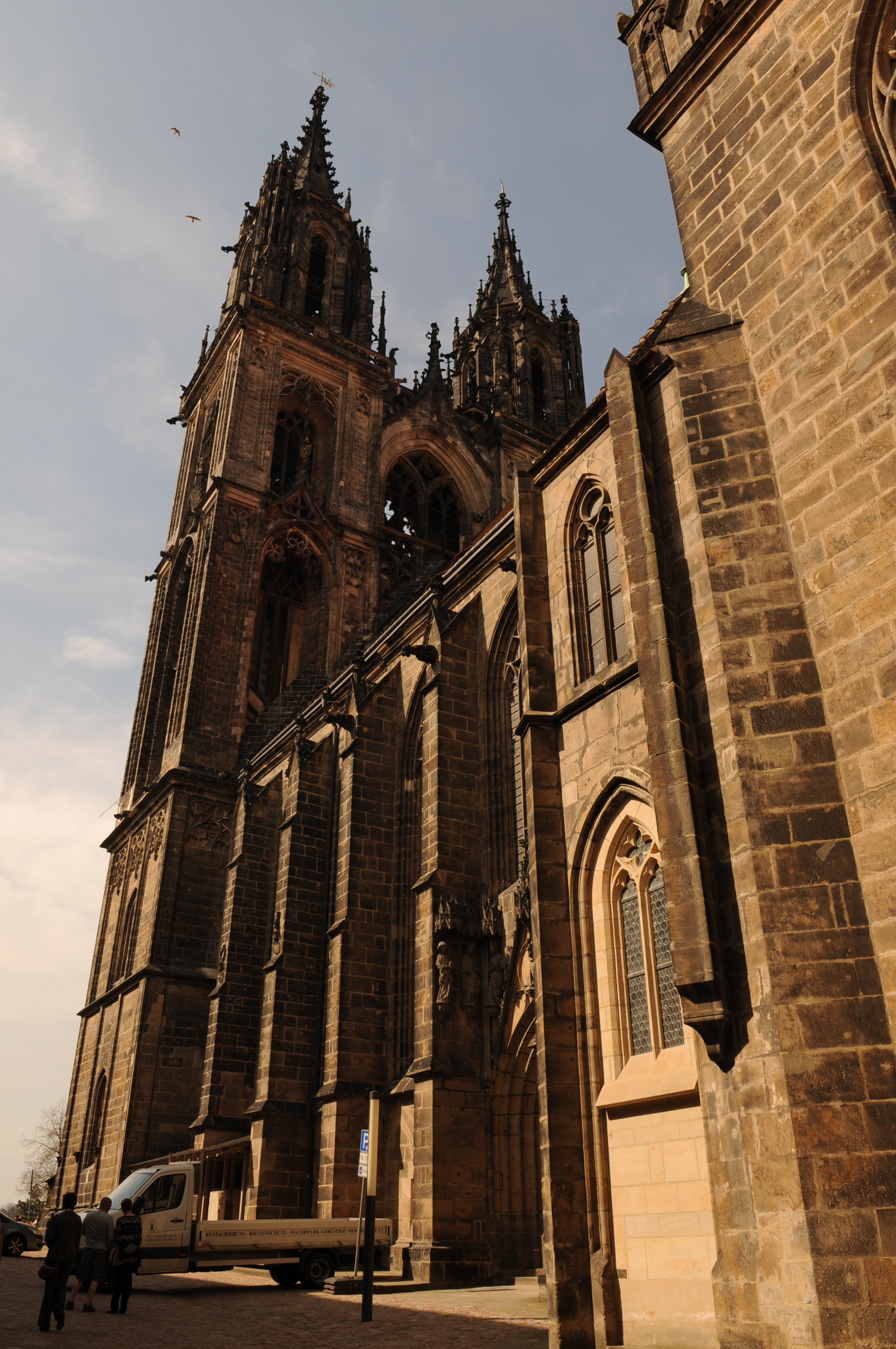
The spires added to Meissen Cathedral

Carl Wilhelm Ernst Schäfer (born 18 January 1844 in Kassel - 5 May 1908 in Carlsfeld, district of Brehna in the former district of Bitterfeld) was a German architect and university professor.

Schäfer became the most important representative of the late Gothic Revival in Germany. He created several churches: Modification of the Catholic Propsteikirche St. Gertrude of Brabant in Wattenscheid (1869-1872), Catholic parish church of St. Nikolai in Lippstadt (1873-1875), Protestant church in Bralitz (1889-1890), Catholic parish church of St. John Baptist in Birkung (1885-1893), Old Catholic Church in Karlsruhe (1895-1897).

As a monument conservator, he led the reconstruction of the Friedrichsbaues of Heidelberg Castle (1890-1900), the Romanesque monastery church of St. Gangolf in Münchenlohra in Nordhausen (1882-1885) and the Church of Saint-Pierre-le-Jeune in Strasbourg (1897-1901). He added the pair of 81 metre spires to the Meissen Cathedral in a highly convincing neo-Gothic style from 1903 to 1908. This now forms a critical part of the Meissen World Heritage Site.

In 1871, he had built a fountain on the property of his lawyer Carl Grimm in Marburg.
