= Frederick, Hereditary Prince of Saxony =

German aristocrat

Frederick, Hereditary Prince of Saxony (15 March 1504, Dresden – 26 February 1539, Dresden) was a German nobleman and member of the Albertine branch of the House of Wettin.

== Life ==
He was the seventh child and fifth son of George, Duke of Saxony and Barbara Jagiellon, and grandson of Casimir IV Jagiellon. Mentally disabled, he was the second of only four of their ten children to survive to adulthood and, on the death of his elder brother John in 1537, succeeded him as hereditary prince of the Duchy of Saxony.

In Dresden on 27 January 1539, he married the Catholic Elisabeth (ca. 1516–1541), daughter of Ernest II, Count of Mansfeld-Vorderort and sister of Peter Ernst I von Mansfeld-Vorderort. However, he died four weeks later and the marriage was childless. On the day of his death, Frederick's father released him from his obligation to do homage: George had hoped that "his obedient son [ie Frederick] would leave behind him so many seeds that his [ie George's] lands might have a ruling lord".

Frederick was buried in the chapel at Meissen Cathedral. George promoted the marriage of Frederick's widow, Elisabeth, to Maurice, son of George's Lutheran younger brother, Henry. Henry vetoed the idea and, soon afterwards, inherited the Duchy of Saxony from George when the latter died without surviving male issue in April 1539, less than two months after Frederick. The Duchy thus passed out of Catholic hands.

== Bibliography (in German) ==
- Karl Wilhelm Böttiger: Geschichte des Kurstaates und Königreiches Sachsen ..., S. 485
- Friedrich Albert von Langenn: Moritz, Herzog und Churfuerst zu Sachsen: eine Darstellung aus dem ..., Volume 1, S. 72
- Matthäus Ratzeberger: Luther und seine Zeit, S. 169
- Franz Otto Stichart: Das Königreich Sachsen und seine Fürsten: e. geschichtl. Abriß für Schule u ..., S. 143
