= Catherine of Mecklenburg =

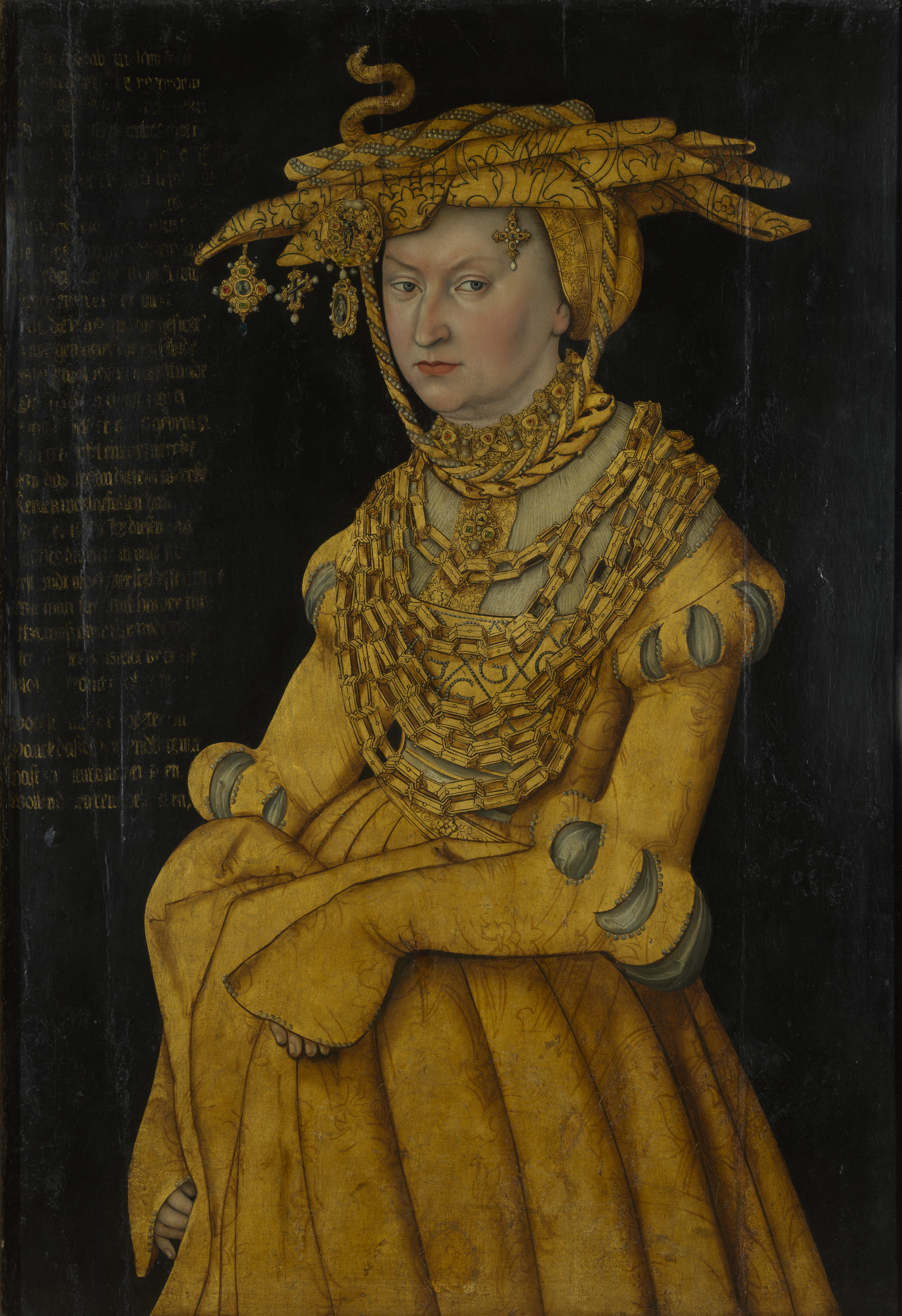
- Portrait by Lucas Cranach the Elder

Duchess consort of Saxony Margravine consort of Meissen
- Tenure: 1539–1541
- Born: 1487
- Died: 6 June 1561 (aged 73–74); Torgau
- Burial: Freiberg
- Spouse: Henry the Pious
- Issue: Sybille, Duchess of Saxe-Lauenburg; Emilie, Margravine of Brandenburg-Ansbach; Sidonie, Duchess of Brunswick-Kalenberg; Maurice, Elector of Saxony; Prince Severinus; Augustus, Elector of Saxony
- House: House of Mecklenburg
- Father: Magnus II, Duke of Mecklenburg
- Mother: Sophie of Pomerania-Stettin

Catherine of Mecklenburg (also Katharina von Mecklenburg) (1487 – 6 June 1561, Torgau), was a German author, and a Duchess of Saxony by marriage to Henry IV, Duke of Saxony. She was the daughter of the Duke Magnus II of Mecklenburg and Sophie of Pomerania-Stettin.

== Life ==
She married on 6 July 1512 in Freiberg Duke Henry the Pious of Saxony, and they ruled together.

Catherine sympathized early with Martin Luther's teachings, while her husband suppressed the Reformation until 1536 for fear of his brother, the reigning Duke George the Bearded. Later, the Freiberg area became Lutheran, due in a large part to her Reformation-supporting influence.

When Duke George tried bear down on Catherine, according to legend she told the envoy: You could do me a big favor by leaving Freiberg right now. In 1539, after the death of Duke George, the couple moved to Dresden and brought the Reformation there. Duke Henry died on 18 August 1541; Catherine outlived him by 20 years. She spent her days in Wolkenstein castle.

== Published works ==
In 1560, she published a book on etiquette for ladies, which is seen as culturally and historically interesting.

== Issue ==
She had six children with Henry the Pious:

- Sibylle (1515–1592) married in 1540 Duke Francis I of Saxe-Lauenburg (1510–1581)
- Emilie (1516–1591) married in 1533 Margrave George the Pious of Brandenburg-Ansbach (1484–1534)
- Sidonie (1518–1575) married in 1545 Duke Eric II of Brunswick-Lüneburg (1528–1584)
- Maurice (1521–1553), Elector of Saxony; married in 1541 Agnes of Hesse (1527–1555)
- Severinus (1522–1533)
- Augustus (1526–1586), Elector of Saxony married in 1548 Anne of Denmark and Norway (1532–1585)

== Ancestry ==
Ancestors of Catherine of Mecklenburg

8. John IV, Duke of Mecklenburg-Schwerin
4. Henry IV, Duke of Mecklenburg-Schwerin
9. Catherine of Saxe-Lauenburg
2. Magnus II, Duke of Mecklenburg-Schwerin and Güstrow
10. Frederick I, Elector of Brandenburg
5. Dorothea of Brandenburg
11. Elisabeth of Bavaria
1. Catherine of Mecklenburg
12. Wartislaw IX, Duke of Pomerania-Wolgast
6. Eric II, Duke of Pomerania
13. Sophie of Saxe-Lauenburg-Ratzeburg
3. Sophie of Pomerania-Stettin
14. Bogislaw IX, Duke of Pomerania-Stargard
7. Sophia of Pomerania-Stolp
15. Maria of Masovia

== See also ==
- Portraits of Henry IV of Saxony and Catherine of Mecklenburg

Catherine of Mecklenburg House of Mecklenburg Born: 1487 Died: 6 June 1561
German royalty
Preceded by Barbara Jagiellon	Duchess consort of Saxony; Margravine consort of Meissen; 17 April 1539 – 18 August 1541	Succeeded by Agnes of Hesse
