= Meissen Cathedral =

- Church of St John and St Donatus
- Meißner Dom
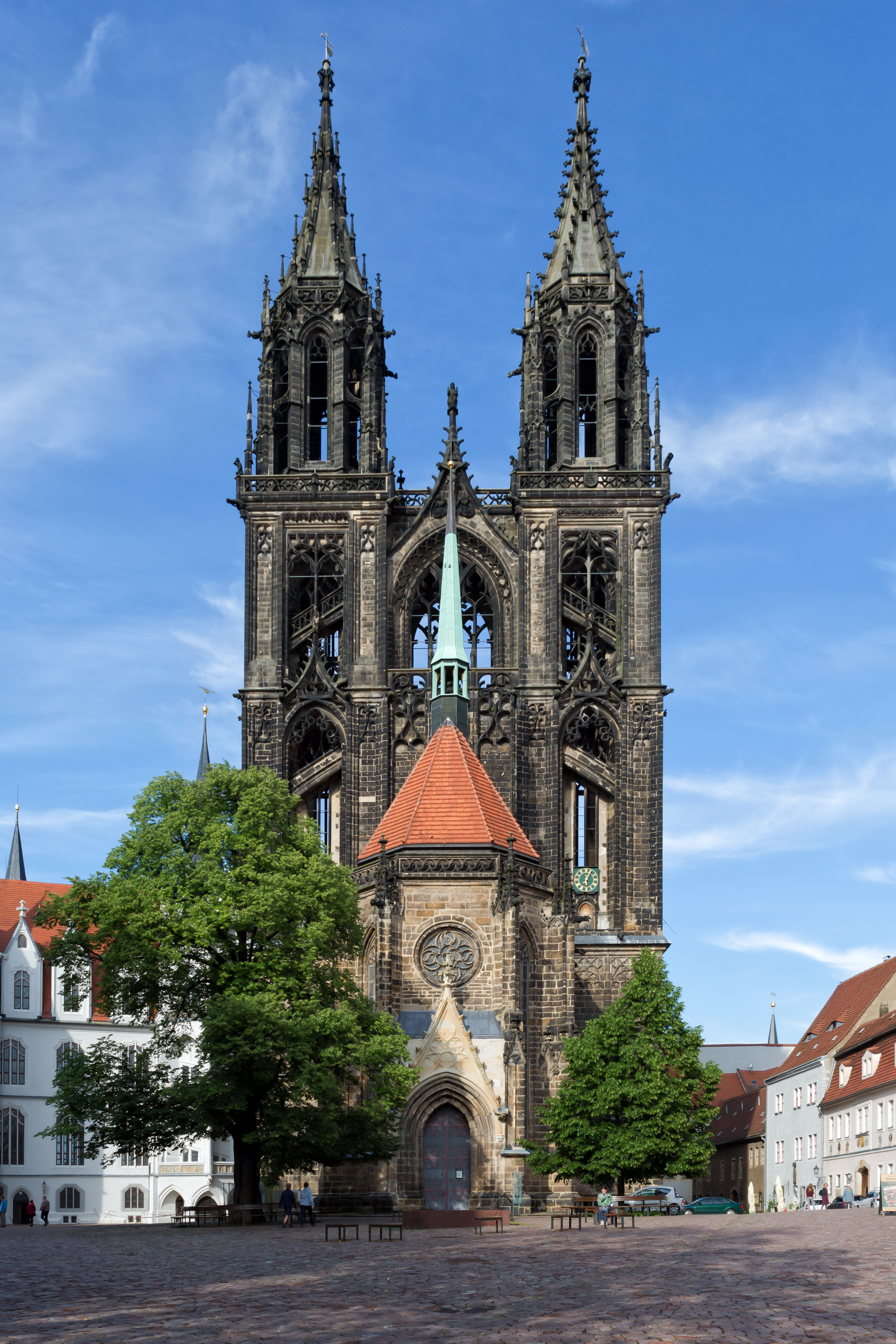
- Meissen Cathedral, western façade with Prince's Chapel.
- Meissen Cathedral
- 51°09′58″N 13°28′17″E
- Location: Meissen, Saxony
- Address: Domplatz 2
- Country: Germany
- Denomination: Lutheran
- Previous denomination: Roman Catholic

History
- Status: Parish church
- Dedication: John the Evangelist and Donatus of Arezzo

Architecture
- Heritage designation: Heritage Monument in Saxony
- Architectural type: Basilica
- Style: Gothic; Neogothic (spires)
- Groundbreaking: 1250
- Completed: 1410

Specifications
- Length: 97.3 m (319 ft 3 in)
- Height: 17.8 m (58 ft 5 in)
- Materials: Ashlar

Administration
- Diocese: Evangelical-Lutheran Church of Saxony

Clergy
- Bishop: Tobias Bilz
- Priest: Andreas Beuchel

Meissen Cathedral or the Church of St John and St Donatus (German: Meißner Dom) is a Gothic church in Meissen in Saxony. It is situated on the castle hill of Meissen, adjacent to the Albrechtsburg castle and forms a critical centrepiece of the iconic Meissen skyline overlooking the River Elbe in the valley below.

== History ==
It was the episcopal see of the Bishopric of Meissen established by Emperor Otto I in 968. It replaced an older Romanesque church. The present-day hall church was built between 1260 and 1410, the interior features Gothic sculptures of founder Emperor Otto and his wife Adelaide of Italy as well as paintings from the studio of Lucas Cranach the Elder. The first Saxon elector from the House of Wettin, Margrave Frederick I, had the Prince's Chapel erected in 1425 as the burial place of his dynasty. The twin steeples were not attached until 1909.

In 1581 the Meissen diocese was dissolved in the course of the Protestant Reformation, and the church was used by the Protestant Church since. It is the cathedral church of the Evangelical-Lutheran Church of Saxony.

The pulpit is located relatively centrally, accessed from the north aisle. The unusual design (with a door preventing public access) dates from 1591.

The church is divided into three sections: the inner church and choir stalls, containing a fine Flemish altarpiece; the main nave (of enormous height and in the Perpendicular style, which contains a further altarpiece by Lucas Cranach; and to the west the Prince's Chapel, which as a magnificent portal separating from the main church. The latter contains the kings and queens of Saxony.

The pair of 81 metre high Neo-Gothic spires, critical to the Meissen skyline, were actually only added 1903 to 1909. They were designed by Carl Schäfer.

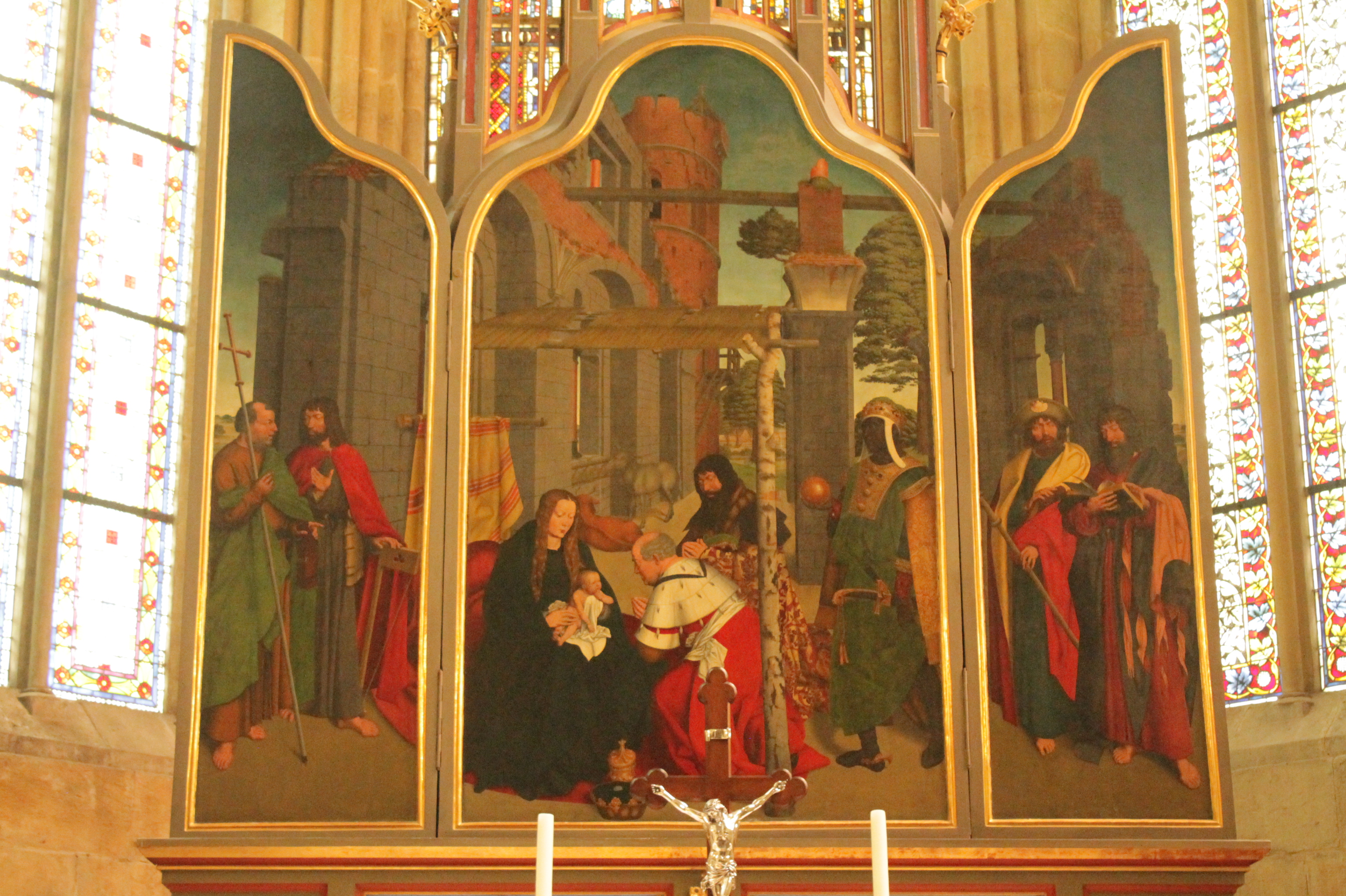
The altarpiece (eastern section)

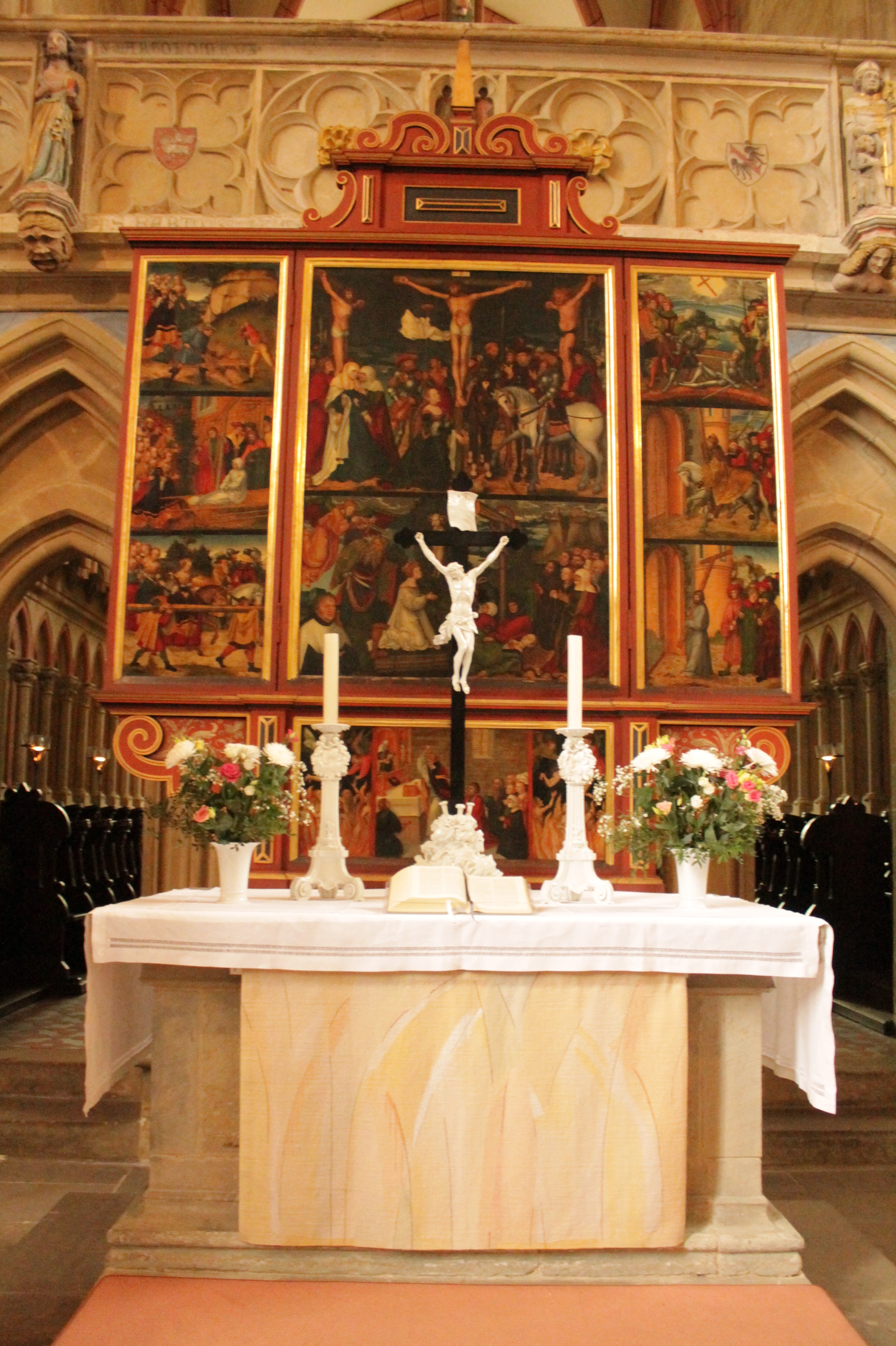
Cranach altarpiece

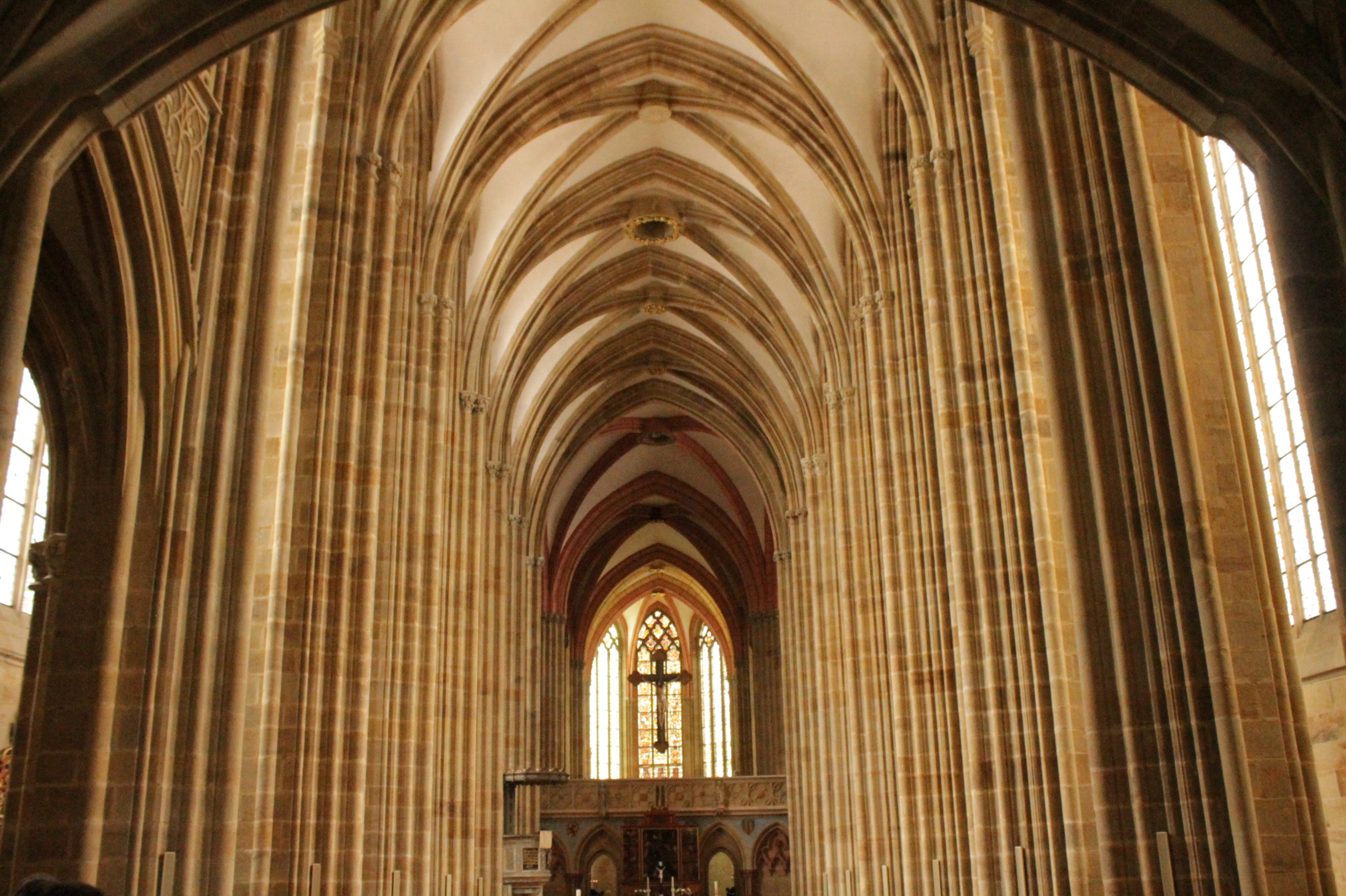

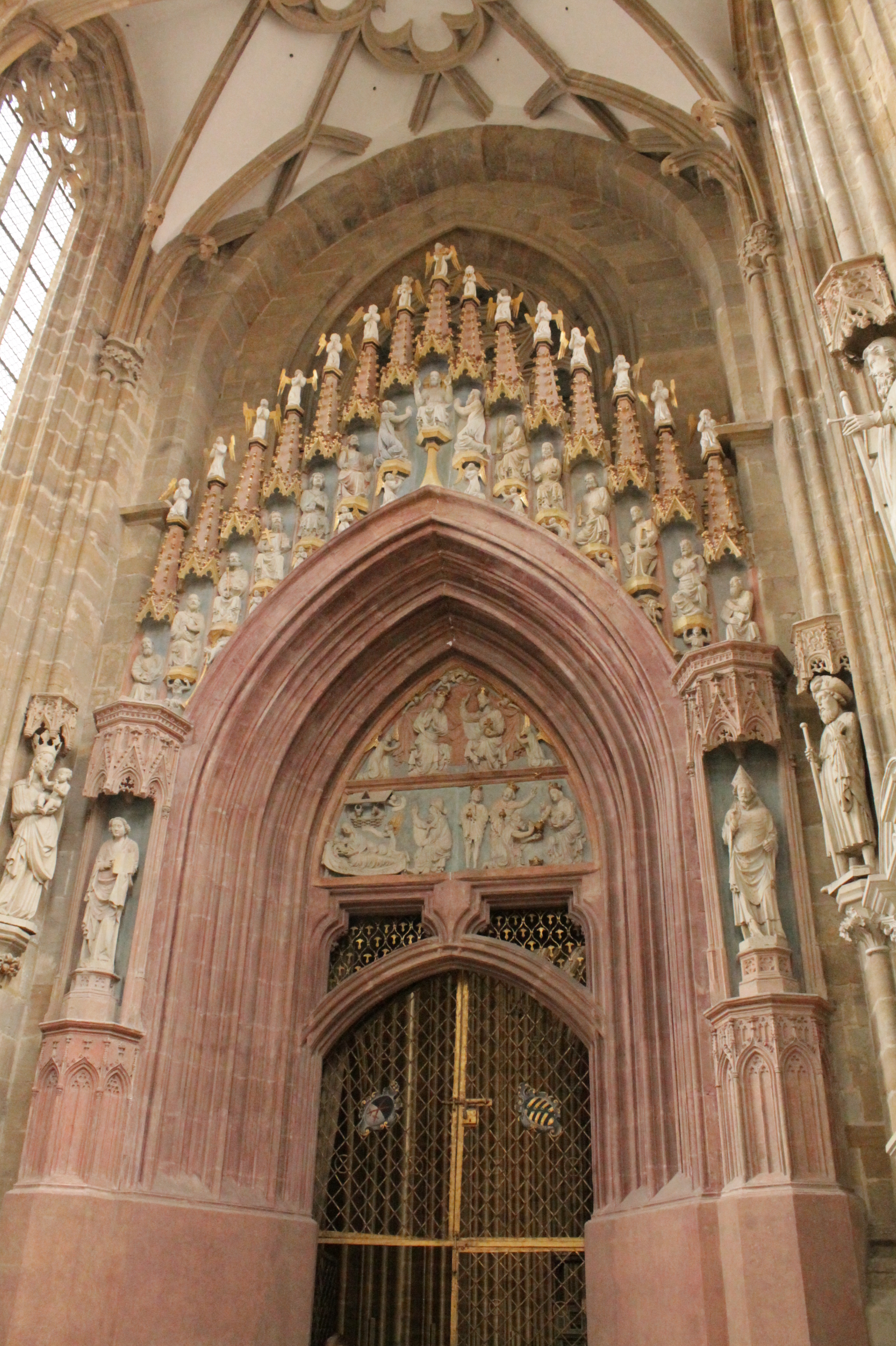
Portal to the Princes Chapel

== Burials ==
in the Prince's Chapel

- Frederick I, Elector of Saxony
- Catherine of Brunswick-Lüneburg
- Frederick II, Elector of Saxony
- Ernst, Elector of Saxony
- Albrecht III, Duke of Saxony
- Sidonie of Poděbrady
- John, Hereditary Prince of Saxony
- Anna of Saxony (unmarked grave)

Others

- Bishop Benno of Meissen
- George, Duke of Saxony also known as George the Bearded (in the purpose-built Georgskapelle to the south-west) and his wife Barbara Jagiellon
- Barthel Lauterbach
- Christoph Ziegler
