= Henry IV of Saxony =

Duke of Saxony from 1539 to 1541

Henry IV
- Duke of Saxony; Margrave of Meissen; Lord of Friesland
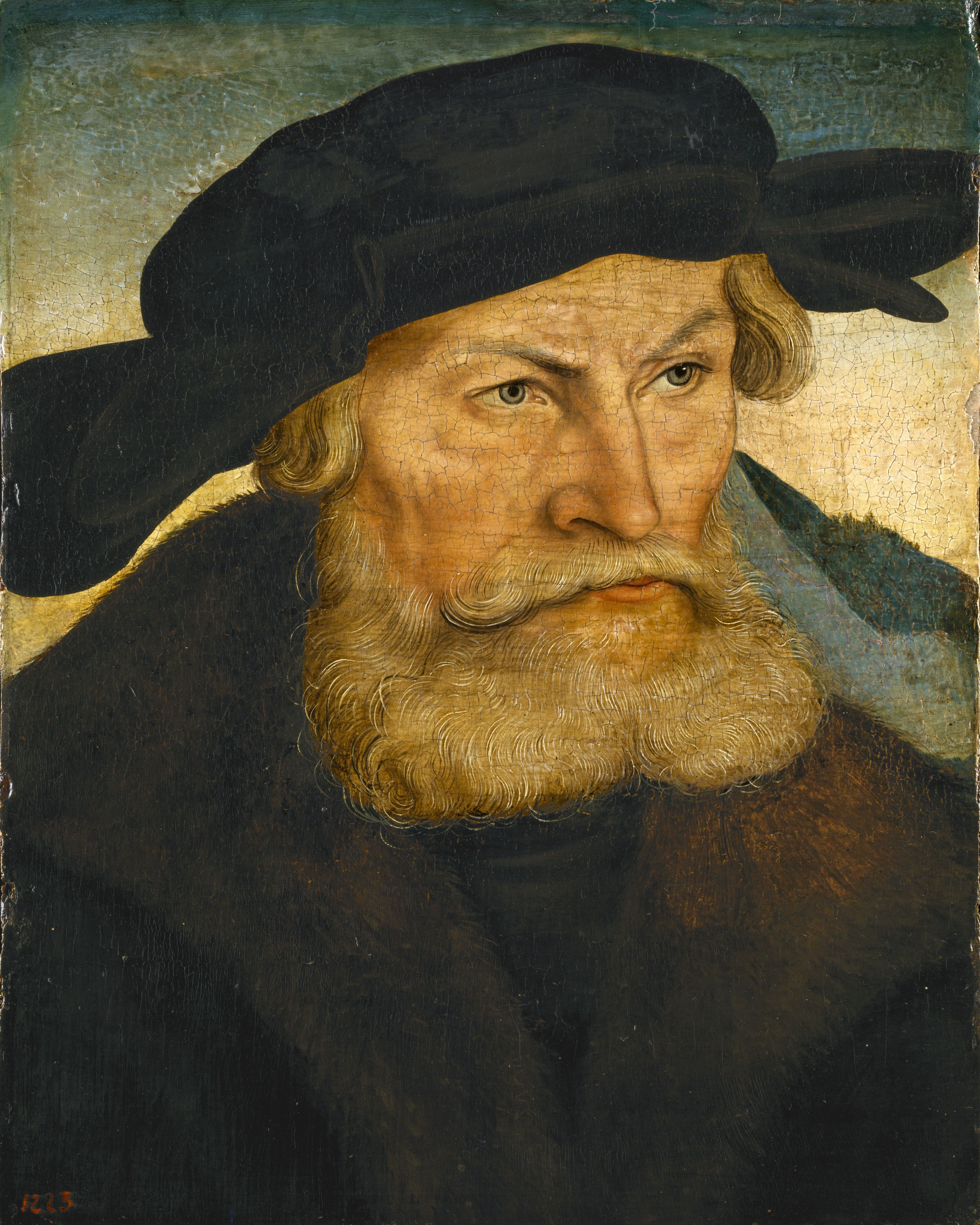

Duke of Saxony Margrave of Meissen
- Reign: 17 April 1539 – 18 August 1541
- Predecessor: George
- Successor: Maurice
- Born: 16 March 1473; Dresden, Electorate of Saxony, Holy Roman Empire
- Died: 18 August 1541 (aged 68); Dresden, Electorate of Saxony, Holy Roman Empire
- Burial: Freiberg Cathedral
- Spouse: Catherine of Mecklenburg
- Issue: Sybille, Duchess of Saxe-Lauenburg; Emilie, Margravine of Brandenburg-Ansbach; Sidonie, Duchess of Brunswick-Kalenberg; Maurice, Elector of Saxony; Prince Severinus; Augustus, Elector of Saxony
Names
- Heinrich der Fromme
- House: Wettin (Albertine line)
- Father: Albert III, Duke of Saxony
- Mother: Sidonie of Poděbrady
- Religion: Lutheran (1536–1541); Roman Catholic (1473–1536)

Henry IV the Pious, Duke of Saxony (German: Heinrich der Fromme; 16 March 1473, in Dresden – 18 August 1541, in Dresden) was a Duke of Saxony from the House of Wettin. Succeeding his brother George, Duke of Saxony, a fervent Catholic who sought to extinguish Lutheranism by any means possible, Henry established the Lutheran church as the state religion in his domains.

== Biography ==
Henry was the second son of Albert, Duke of Saxony, and his wife Sidonie Podiebrad, princess of Bohemia. When Albert died in 1500, his eldest son George succeeded to the Duchy of Saxony, and Henry became Lord of Friesland.

Saxon rule of Friesland was disturbed by constant revolts. Consequently, Henry, who was of a rather inert disposition, gave up his title there. In 1505 Henry ceded Friesland to George, in return for an annuity and the districts of Wolkenstein and Freiberg, where Henry made his residence.

In 1517, Martin Luther posted the Ninety-five Theses which sparked the Reformation in Germany, and a few years later Henry adopted the Evangelical faith. George remained a devout Catholic. Only two of George's sons survived to adulthood, John and Frederick, but they both predeceased him without issue. When Frederick died in 1539, the Lutheran Henry became heir presumptive to the duchy under the Act of Settlement of 1499. To prevent a Protestant succession, George tried to override his father's will, disinherit Henry, and bequeath the duchy to Ferdinand, brother of Charles V. However, George died only two months later, and Henry succeeded to the duchy aged 66. He made Lutheranism the state religion of the Duchy of Saxony but reigned for only two years.

== Marriage and children ==
In Freiberg, on 6 July 1512, Henry married Catherine of Mecklenburg, daughter of Duke Magnus II of Mecklenburg-Schwerin. They had:

- Sybille (b. Freiberg, 2 May 1515 – d. Buxtehude, 18 July 1592), married on 8 February 1540 to Duke Francis I of Saxe-Lauenburg.
- Emilie (b. Freiberg, 27 July 1516 – d. Ansbach, 9 March 1591), married on 25 August 1533 to Georg, Margrave of Brandenburg-Ansbach.
- Sidonie (b. Meissen, 8 March 1518 – d. Kloster Weissenfels, 4 January 1575), married on 17 May 1545 to Eric II, Duke of Brunswick-Lüneburg (Calenberg).
- Maurice (b. Freiberg, 21 March 1521 – d. of wounds received in action at Sievershausen, 11 July 1553), later Elector of Saxony
- Severinus (b. Freiberg?, 28 August 1522 – d. Innsbruck, 10 October 1533).
- Augustus (b. Freiberg, 31 July 1526 – d. Dresden, 11 February 1586)
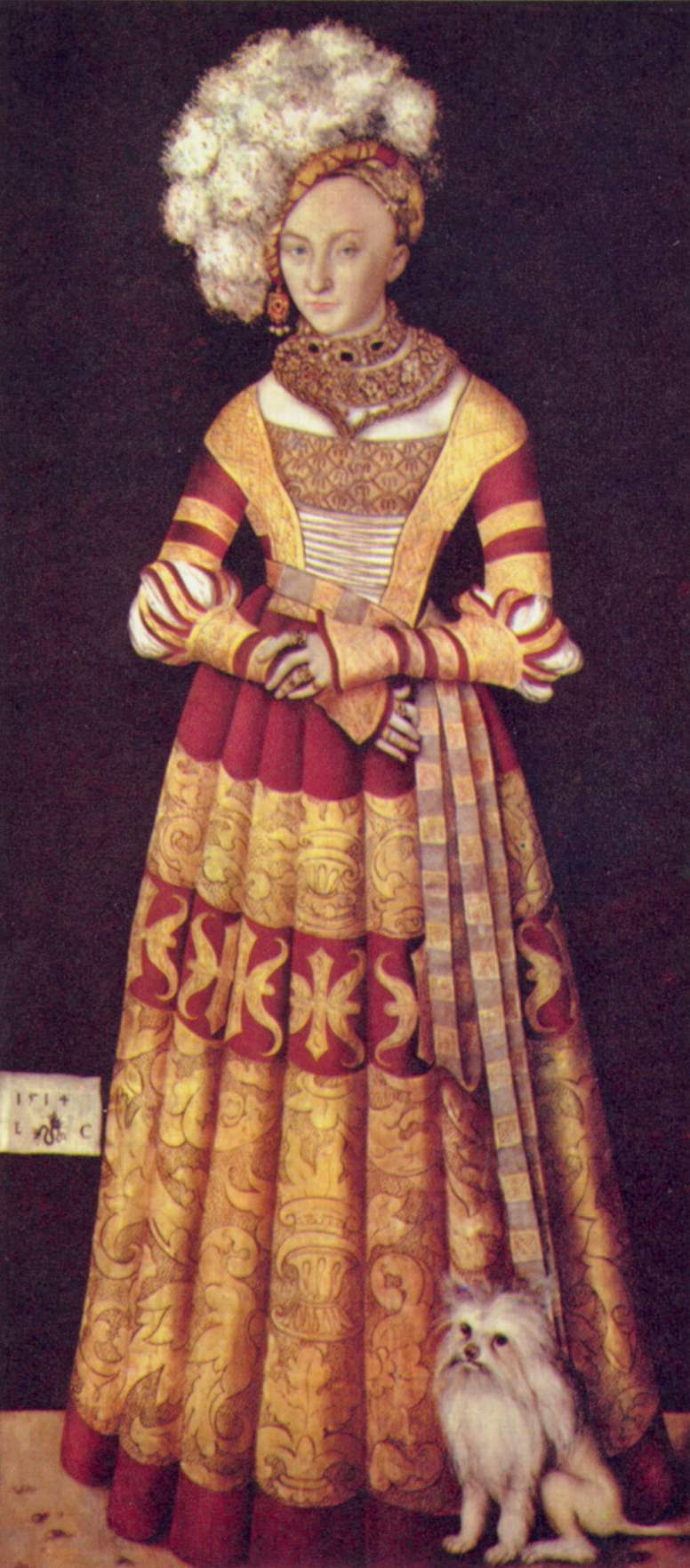
Catherine of Mecklenburg

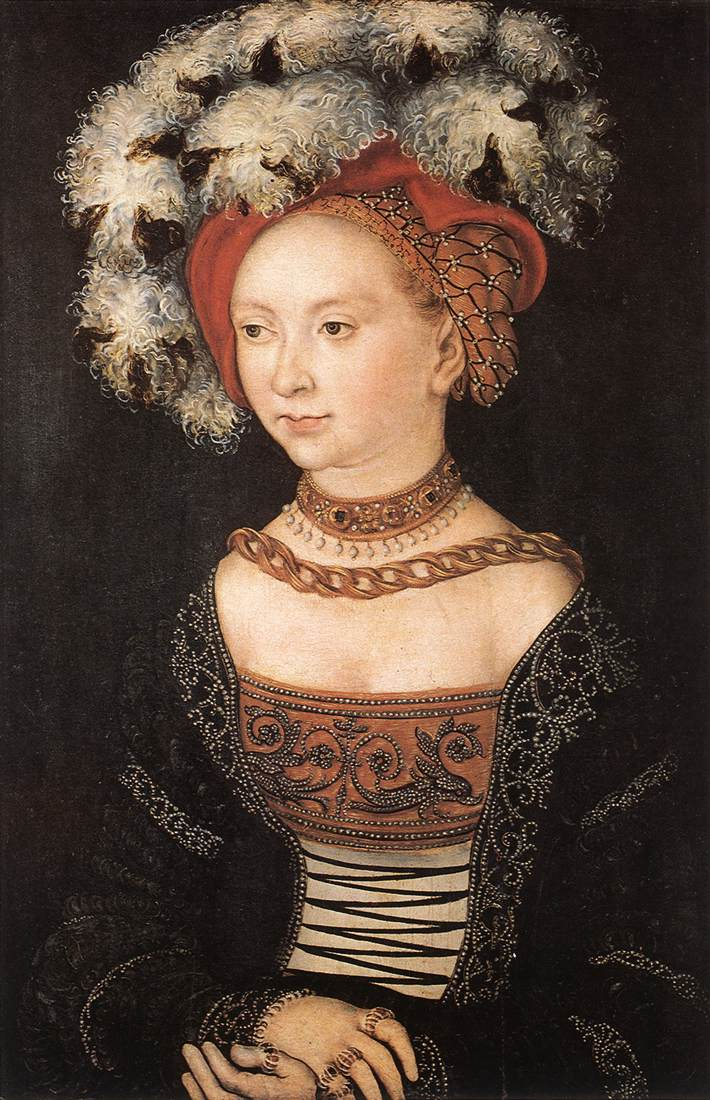
Sybille

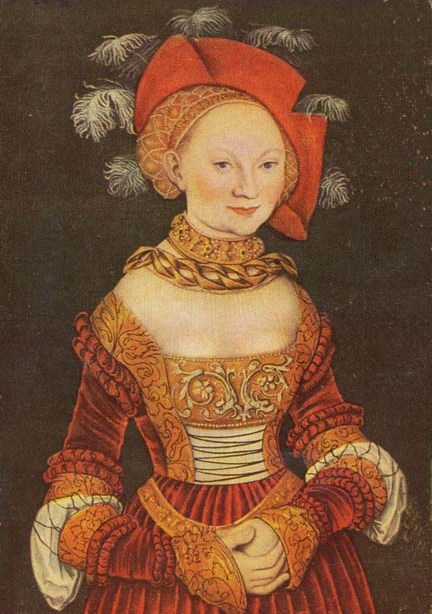
Emilie

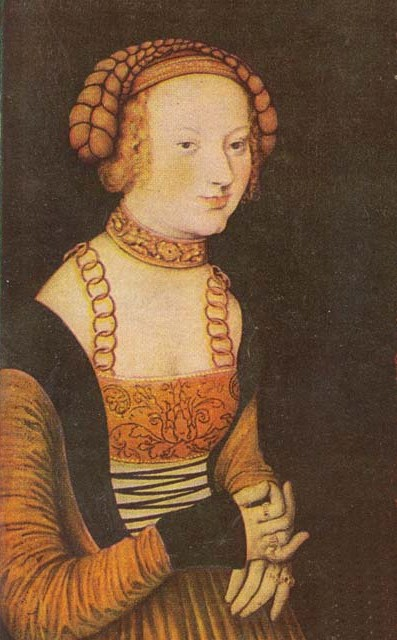
Sidonie

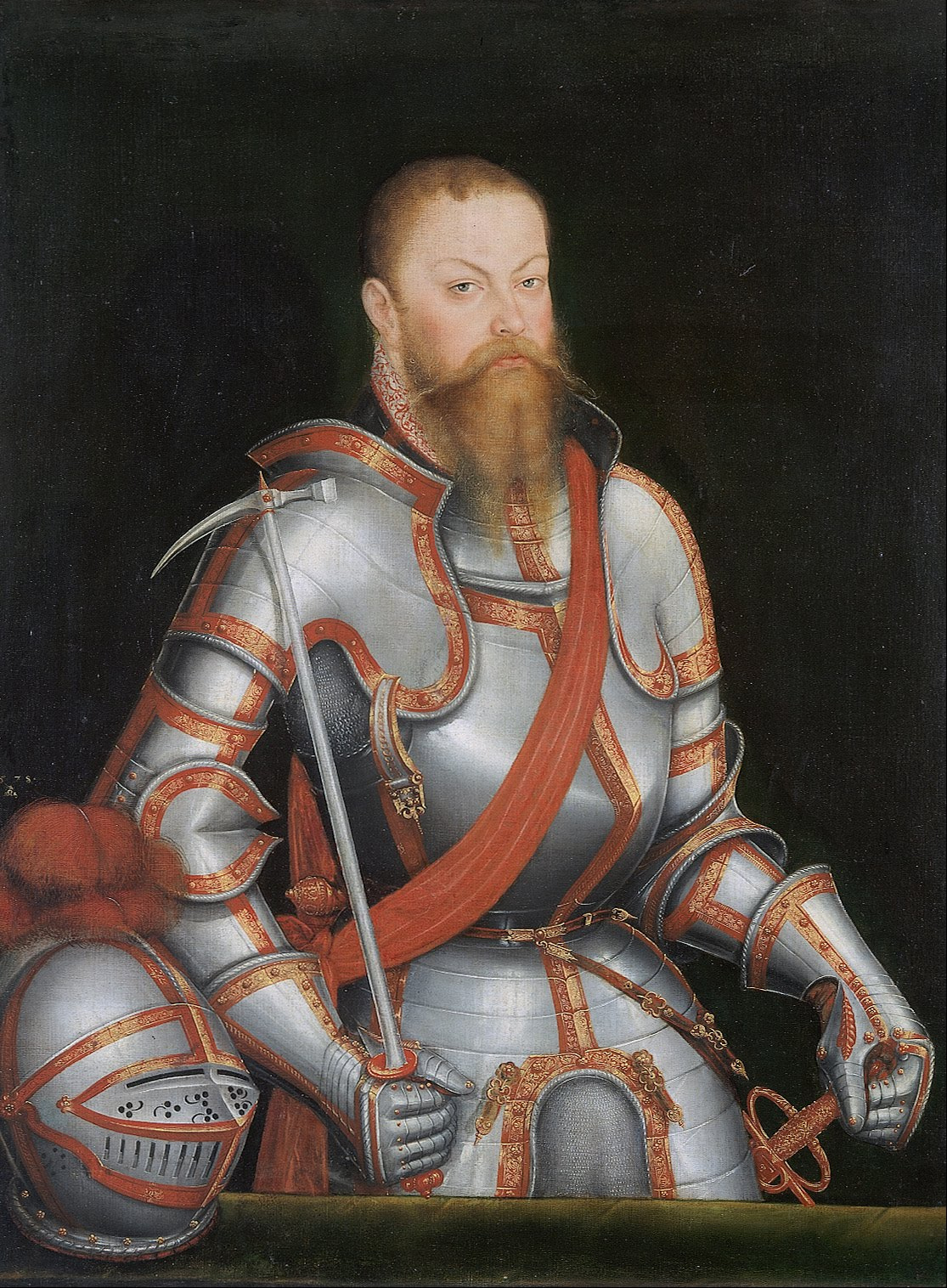
Maurice

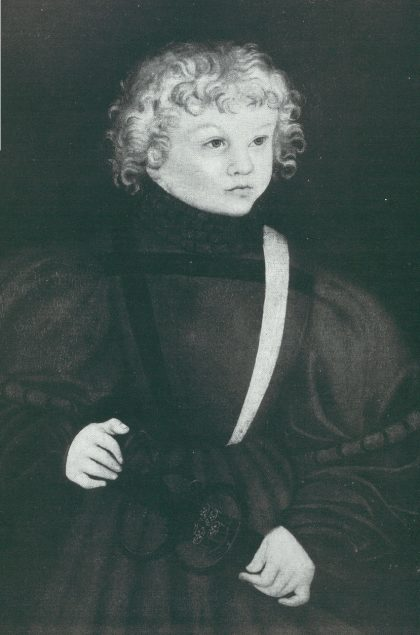
Severinus

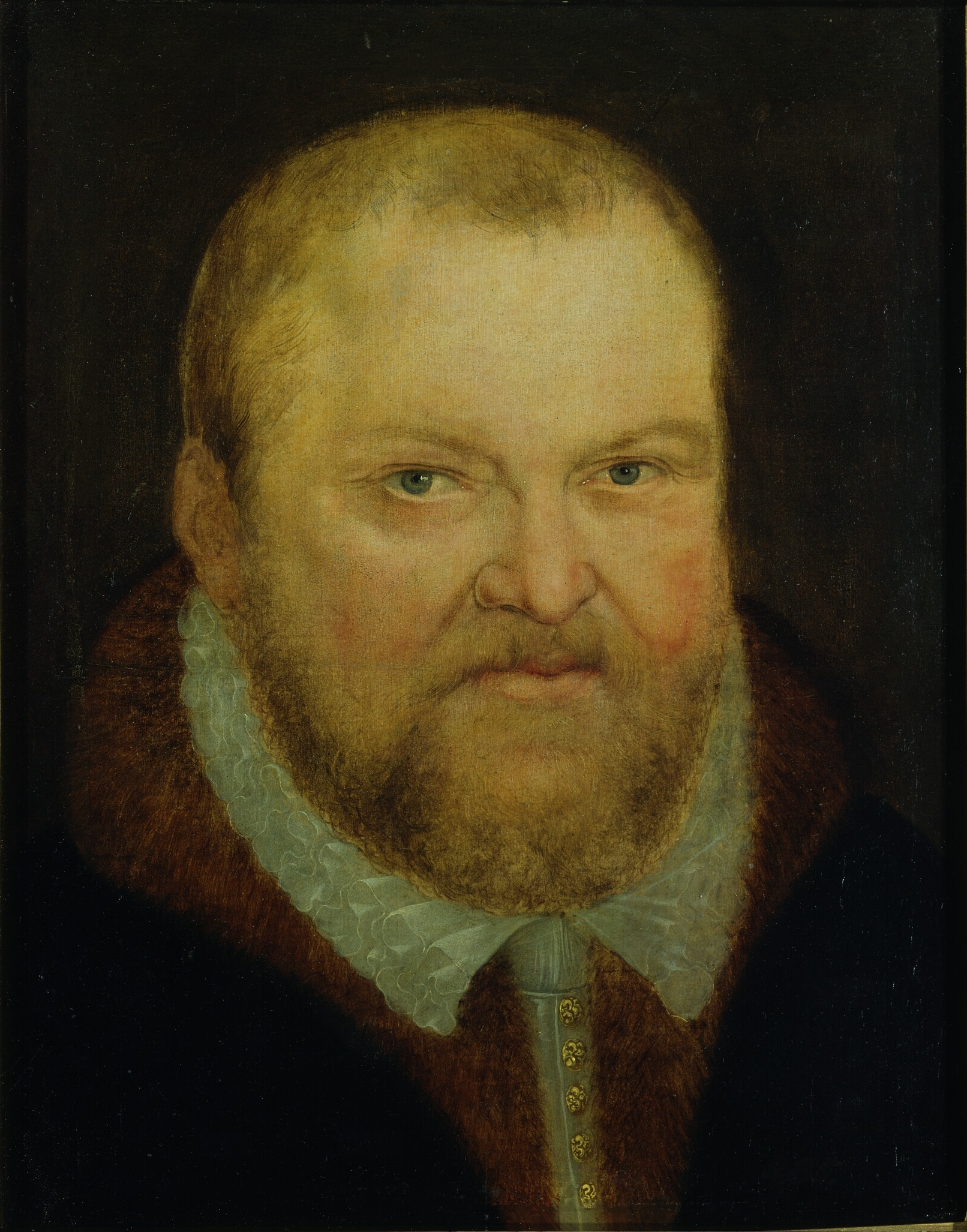
Augustus

== Sources ==
- Rapelli, Paola (2011). Symbols of Power in Art. J. Paul Getty.
- Lavery, Jason (2021). Germany's Northern Challenge: The Holy Roman Empire and the Scandinavian Struggle for the Baltic 1563-1576. Brill. ISBN 9789004475700.

Henry IV of Saxony House of Wettin Born: 16 March 1473 Died: 18 August 1541
Regnal titles
Preceded by George	Duke of Saxony; 1539–1541	Succeeded by Maurice
