= George, Duke of Saxony =

Duke of Saxony from 1500 to 1539

George
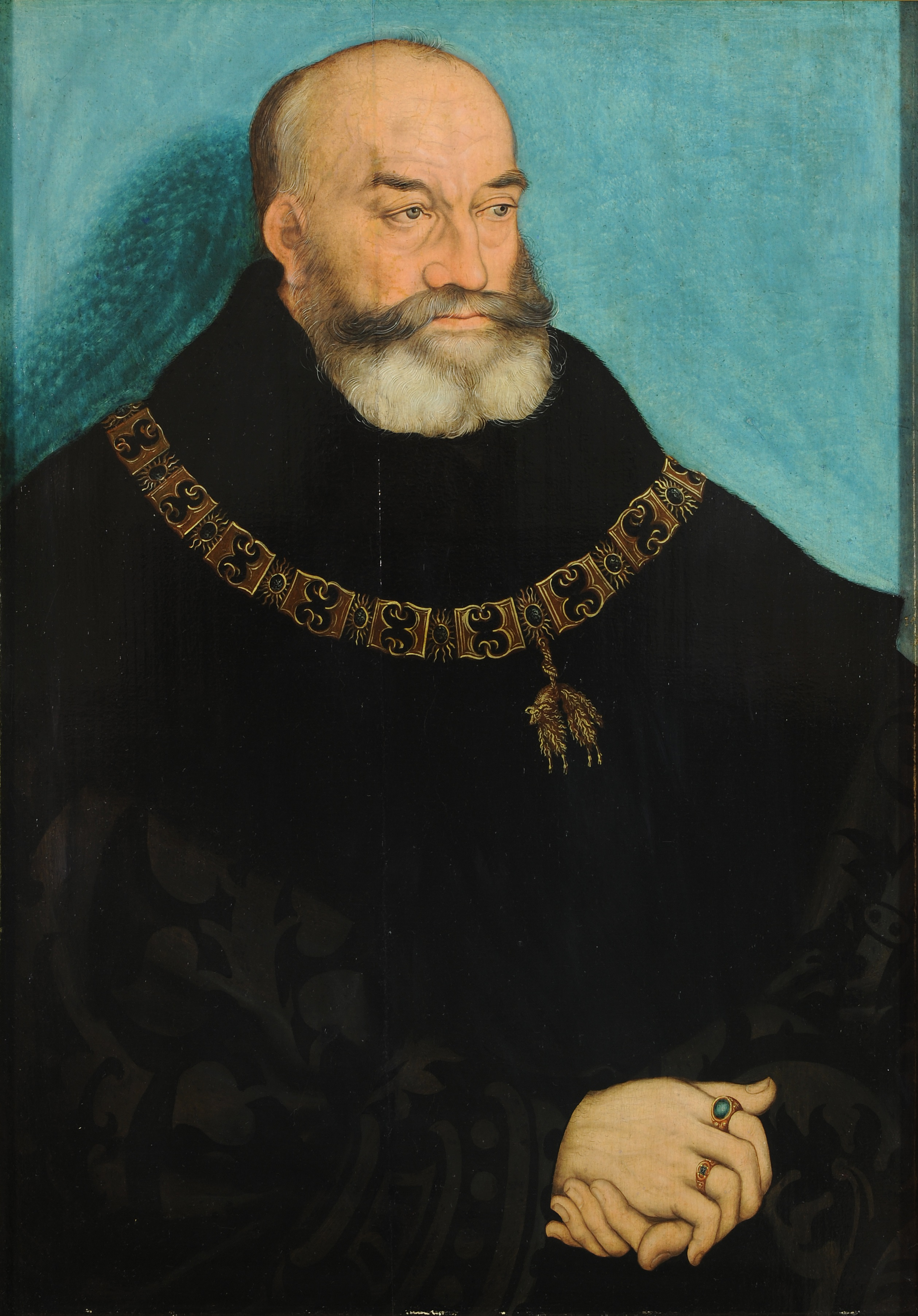
- Portrait by Lucas Cranach the Elder, c. 1534

Duke of Saxony Margrave of Meissen
- Reign: 12 September 1500 – 17 April 1539
- Predecessor: Albert III & IV
- Successor: Henry IV
- Born: 27 August 1471; Meissen
- Died: 17 April 1539 (aged 67); Dresden
- Spouse: Barbara Jagiellon (m. 1496; died 1534)
- Issue Detail: John, Hereditary Prince of Saxony; Frederick, Hereditary Prince of Saxony; Christine, Landgravine of Hesse; Magdalena, Electoral Princess of Brandenburg
- House: Wettin (Albertine line)
- Father: Albert III, Duke of Saxony
- Mother: Sidonie of Poděbrady

George the Bearded (German: Georg der Bärtige; 27 August 1471, Meissen – 17 April 1539, Dresden) was Duke of Saxony from 1500 to 1539 and was known for his strong opposition to the Reformation. While the Ernestine line accepted Lutheranism, the Albertines, led by George, resisted religious change. Although he tried to prevent a Lutheran succession, the Act of Settlement of 1499 ensured that, after his death in 1539, Henry IV—a Lutheran—became duke and introduced Lutheranism as the official state religion of the Albertine territories.

George was also a knight of the Order of the Golden Fleece.

== Life ==
His father was Albert the Brave of Saxony, founder of the Albertine line of the Wettin family, his mother was Sidonie, daughter of George of Poděbrady, King of Bohemia. Elector Frederick the Wise, a member of the Ernestine branch of the same family, known for his protection of Luther, was a cousin of Duke George.

George, as the eldest son, received an excellent training in theology and other branches of learning, and was thus much better educated than most of the princes of his day.

As early as 1488, when his father was in East Frisia fighting on behalf of the emperor, George was regent of the ducal possessions, which included the Margraviate of Meissen with the cities of Dresden and Leipzig.

He is buried with his wife Barbara in the purpose-built Georgskapelle in Meissen Cathedral. The room contains a magnificent altarpiece by Lucas Cranach the Elder. In 1677 a highly ornate ceiling was added to the chapel, designed by Wolf Caspar von Klengel.

== Marriage and children ==
George was married at Dresden, on 21 November 1496, to Barbara Jagiellon, daughter of Casimir IV, King of Poland and Grand Duke of Lithuania and Elisabeth, daughter of Albrecht II of Hungary. They had ten children, but all, with the exception of a daughter, died before their father:

1. Christof (b. Dresden, 8 September 1497 – d. Leipzig, 5 December 1497).
2. Johann (b. Dresden, 24 August 1498 – d. Dresden, 11 January 1537), Hereditary Duke of Saxony; married on 20 May 1516 to Elizabeth of Hesse, sister of his brother-in-law. This union was childless.
3. Wolfgang (b. Dresden, 1499 – d. Dresden, 12 January 1500).
4. Anna (b. Dresden, 21 January 1500 – d. Dresden, 23 January 1500).
5. Christof (b. and d. Dresden, 27 May 1501).
6. Agnes (b. Dresden, 7 January 1503 – d. Dresden, 16 April 1503).
7. Friedrich (b. Dresden, 15 March 1504 – d. Dresden, 26 February 1539), Hereditary Duke of Saxony; married on 27 January 1539 to Elisabeth of Mansfeld. This union was childless.
8. Christine (b. Dresden, 25 December 1505 – d. Kassel, 15 April 1549), married on 11 December 1523 to Philip I, Landgrave of Hesse.
9. Magdalena (b. Dresden, 7 March 1507 – d. Berlin, 25 January 1534), married on 6 November 1524 to Joachim Hector, then Hereditary Elector of Brandenburg.
10. Margarete (b. Dresden, 7 September 1508 – d. Dresden, 19 December 1510).

== Duke of Saxony ==
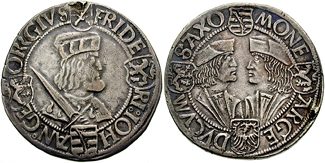
Guldengroschen of Saxony, c. 1508–1525. The obverse shows George's cousin, Frederick, while on the reverse, George is portrayed face to face with the future Elector, John.

In 1498, the emperor granted Albert the Brave the hereditary governorship of Friesland. At Maastricht, 14 February 1499, Albert settled the succession to his possessions, and endeavoured by this arrangement to prevent further partition of his domain. He died 12 September 1500, and was succeeded in his German territories by George as the head of the Albertine line, while George's brother Heinrich became hereditary governor of Friesland.

The Saxon occupation of Friesland, however, was by no means secure and was the source of constant revolts in that province. Consequently, Heinrich, who was of a rather inert disposition, relinquished his claims to the governorship, and in 1505 an agreement was made between the brothers by which Friesland was transferred to George, while Heinrich received an annuity and the districts of Freiberg and Wolkenstein. But this arrangement did not restore peace in Friesland, which remained a source of trouble to Saxony. In 1515 George sold Friesland to the future Emperor Charles V (then Duke of Burgundy) for the very moderate price of 100,000 florins. He tried to keep the newmade lands of het Bildt which weren't granted him by Charles V. These troubles outside of his Saxon possessions did not prevent George from bestowing much care on the government of the ducal territory proper. When regent, during the lifetime of his father, the difficulties arising from conflicting interests and the large demands on his powers had often brought the young prince to the verge of despair.

In a short time, however, he developed decided ability as a ruler; on entering upon his inheritance he divided the duchy into governmental districts, took measures to suppress the robber-knights, and regulated the judicial system by defining and readjusting the jurisdiction of the various law courts. In his desire to achieve good order, severity, and the amelioration of the condition of the people, he sometimes ventured to infringe even on the rights of the cities. His court was better regulated than that of any other German prince, and he bestowed a paternal care on the University of Leipzig, where a number of reforms were introduced, and Humanism, as opposed to Scholasticism, was encouraged.

== Opposition to the Reformation ==
From the beginning of the Reformation in 1517, Duke George directed his energies chiefly to ecclesiastical affairs. Hardly one of the secular German princes held as firmly as he to the Church, he defended its rights and vigorously condemned every innovation except those countenanced by the highest ecclesiastical authorities. At first he was not opposed to Luther, but as time went on and Luther's aim became clear to him, he turned more and more from the Reformer, and was finally, in consequence of this change of attitude, drawn into an acrimonious correspondence in which Luther, according to some without any justification, heavily criticized the duke.

The duke was not blind to the undeniable abuses existing at that time in the Church. In 1519, despite the opposition of the theological faculty of the university, he originated the Disputation of Leipzig, with the idea of helping forward the cause of truth, and was present at all the discussions. In 1521, at the Diet of Worms, when the German princes handed in a paper containing a list of "grievances" concerning the condition of the Church, George added for himself twelve specific complaints referring mainly to the abuse of Indulgences and the annates.

In 1525, he combined with his Lutheran son-in-law, Landgrave Philip of Hesse, and his cousin, the Elector Frederick the Wise, to suppress the revolt of the peasants, who were defeated near Frankenhausen in Thuringia. Some years later, he wrote a forcible preface to a translation of the New Testament issued at his command by his private secretary, Hieronymus Emser, as an offset to Luther's version. Lutheran books were confiscated by his order, wherever found, though he refunded the cost of the books. He proved himself in every way a vigorous opponent of the Lutherans, decreeing that Christian burial was to be refused to apostates, and recreant ecclesiastics were to be delivered to the bishop of Merseburg.

For those, however, who merely held anti-catholic opinions, the punishment was only expulsion from the duchy. The duke deeply regretted the constant postponement of the ardently desired council, from the action of which so much was expected. While awaiting its convocation, he thought to remove the more serious defects by a reform of the monasteries, which had become exceedingly worldly in spirit and from which many of the inmates were departing. He vainly sought to obtain from the Curia the right, which was sometimes granted by Rome, to make official visitations to the conventual institutions of his realm. His reforms were confined mainly to uniting the almost vacant monasteries and to matters of economic management, the control of the property being entrusted in most cases to the secular authorities.

In 1525, Duke George formed, with some other German rulers, the League of Dessau, for the protection of Catholic interests. In the same way he was the animating spirit of the League of Halle, formed in 1533, from which sprang in 1538 the Holy League of Nuremberg for the maintenance of the religious Peace of Nuremberg.

The vigorous activity displayed by the duke in so many directions was not attended with much success. Most of his political measures stood the test of experience, but in ecclesiastico-political matters he witnessed with sorrow the gradual decline of Catholicism and the spread of Lutheranism within his dominions, in spite of his earnest efforts and forcible prohibition of the new doctrine. Furthermore, during George's lifetime his nearest relations his son-in-law Philip of Hesse, and his brother Heinrich, joined the Reformers.

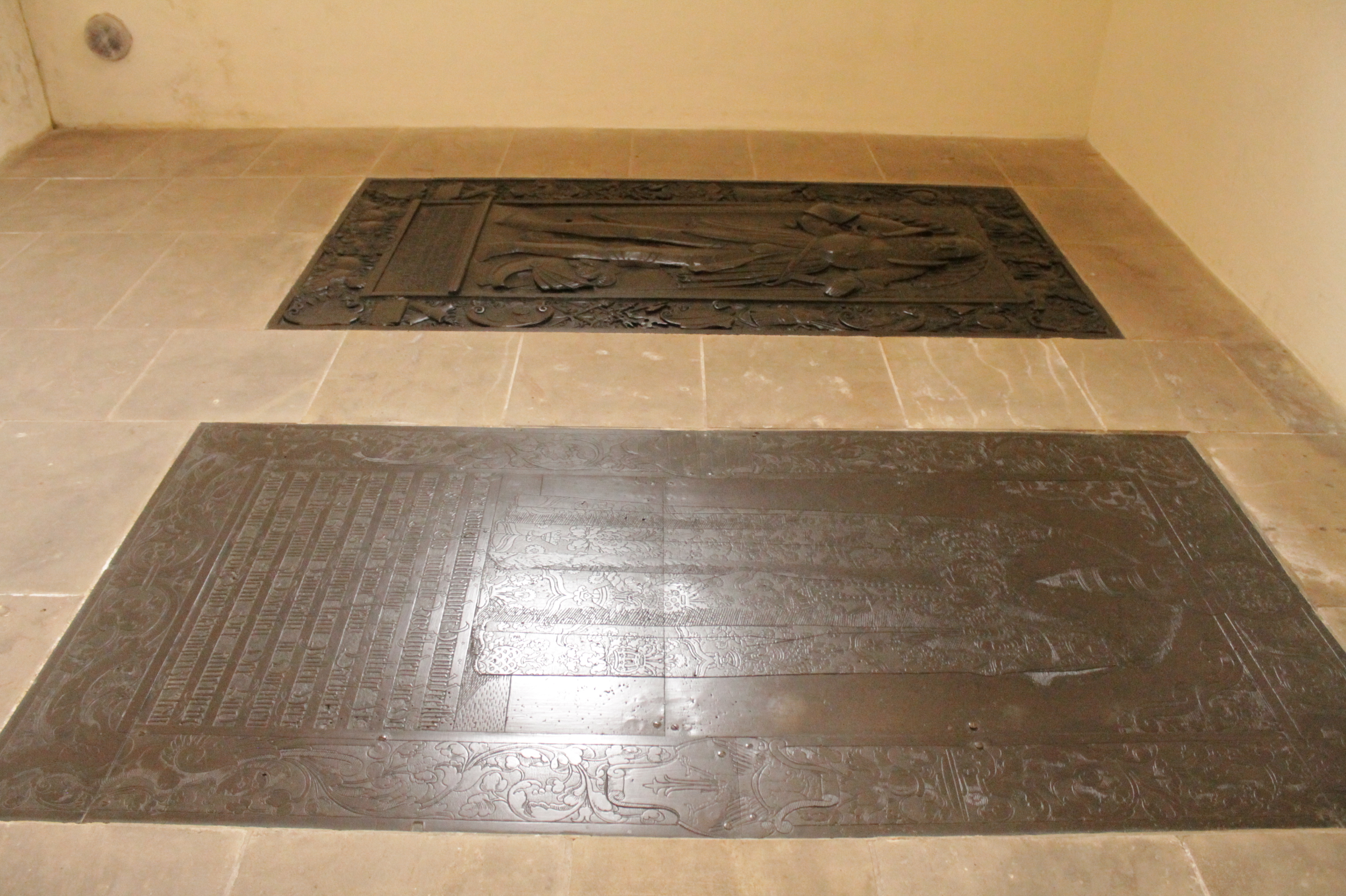
The tomb of George the Bearded in the Georgskappelle, Meissen Cathedral

He spent the last years of his reign in endeavours to secure a Catholic successor, thinking by this step to check the dissemination of Lutheran opinions. The only one of George's sons then living was the weak-minded and unmarried Frederick. The intention of his father was that Frederick should rule with the aid of a council. Early in 1539, Frederick was married to Elizabeth of Mansfeld, but he died shortly afterwards, leaving no prospect of an heir. According to the act of settlement of 1499, George's Protestant brother Heinrich was now heir prospective; but George, disregarding his father's will, sought to disinherit his brother and to bequeath the duchy to Ferdinand, brother of Charles V. His sudden death prevented the carrying out of this intention.

== Character ==
George was an industrious and energetic, if somewhat irascible ruler in the furtherance of the interests of his land and people. A faithful adherent of the Emperor and Empire, he accomplished much for his domain by economy, love of order and wise direction of activities of his state officials. The grief of his life was Luther's Reformation and what he regarded to be apostasy from the Old Faith. Of a strictly religious, although not narrow, disposition, he sought at any cost to keep his subjects from falling away from the Church, but his methods were sometimes questionable.

== See also ==
- Anna II, Abbess of Quedlinburg

== Bibliography ==
- Heinrich Freiherr von Welck: Georg der Bärtige, Herzog von Sachsen. Sein Leben und Wirken. Verlag Richard Sattler, Braunschweig 1900 (Digitalisat)
- Elisabeth Werl (1964). "Georg der Bärtige". Neue Deutsche Biographie (in German). Vol. 6. Berlin: Duncker & Humblot. pp. 224–227. (full text online).
- Friedrich Wilhelm Bautz (1990). "George, Duke of Saxony". In Bautz, Friedrich Wilhelm (ed.). Biographisch-Bibliographisches Kirchenlexikon (BBKL) (in German). Vol. 2. Hamm: Bautz. cols. 209–210. ISBN 3-88309-032-8.
- Christoph Volkmar: Reform statt Revolution. Die Kirchenpolitik Herzog Georgs von Sachsen 1488–1525. Mohr Siebeck, Tübingen 2008, ISBN 978-3-16-149409-3.
- Christoph Volkmar: Catholic Reform in the Age of Luther: Duke George of Saxony and the Church, 1488-1525 (=Studies in Medieval and Reformation Traditions, Vol. 209, ed. by Andrew Colin Gow. Translated by Brian Mc Neil and Bill Ray, Brill, Leiden-Boston 2017. ISBN 978-90-04-26188-4

George, Duke of Saxony House of Wettin Born: 27 August 1471 Died: 17 April 1539
Regnal titles
Preceded by Albert	Duke of Saxony; 1500–1539	Succeeded by Henry IV
