= Von Carlowitz =

Von Carlowitz may refer to the following people from Saxony:

- Adolph von Carlowitz (1858–1928), German army commander in the First World War.
- Hans Carl von Carlowitz (1645–1714), Saxon mining official and father of sustainable forestry.
- John of Carlowitz (1527–1578), Saxon official and instigator of the Pig War.
