= John IX of Haugwitz =

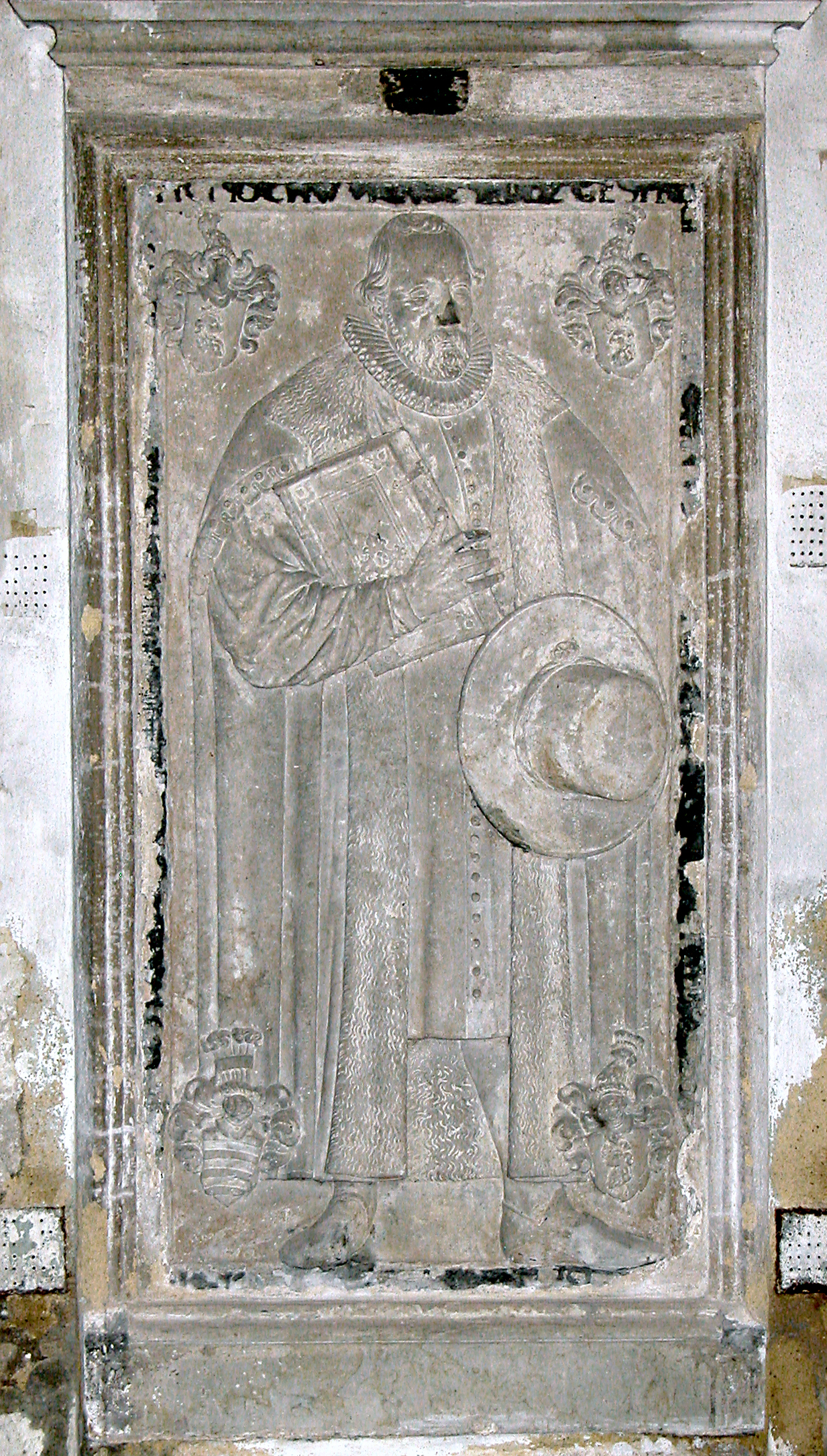
John IX of Haugwitz gravestone in the town church of Neu-Mügeln.

John IX of Haugwitz (German: Johann IX. von Haugwitz, 29 August 1524 – 26 March 1595) was Bishop of Meissen from 1555 to 1559 or 1581.

== Biography ==
John IX was born on 29 August 1524 in Thalheim, Saxony in the Ore Mountains of Saxony. He came from the Haugwitz family, who held several high clerical offices. He was the last bishop of the Bishopric of Meissen, which became a Protestant diocese in the wake of the Protestant Reformation.

On his appointment, John of Carlowitz, a relative of his predecessor began a feud over the inheritance of the episcopal estate. The so-called Pig War or Saukrieg lasted three years before it was resolved by Elector Augustus.

He signed the Formula of Concord in 1577 and the Book of Concord in 1580. In 1581, the bishop resigned from his office and converted to the Protestant faith. In 1559, he appointed Johann Leisentrit as the Administrator of the remaining Roman Catholic areas. In 1582 he married his considerably younger niece, Agnes. After John's death, she married the Electoral Saxon Advisor (Rat) and Amtmann of Stolpen, Hans Georg von Wehse, and had four daughters from that marriage. Agnes was the heiress of the episcopal estate.

John IX died in Mügeln on 26 March 1595; his gravestone is in the town church of Neu-Mügeln.

== See also ==
- Catholic Church in Germany

== Literature ==
- Eduard Machatschek: Geschichte der Bischöfe des Hochstiftes Meissen in chronologischer Reihenfolge (…). Dresden, 1884. pp. 762–830.
- Heinrich Theodor Flathe (1881). "Johann IX. (v. Haugwitz), Bischof von Meißen". Allgemeine Deutsche Biographie (in German). Vol. 14. Leipzig: Duncker & Humblot. pp. 245–246.

Catholic Church titles
| Preceded by Nicolas II of Carlowitz | Bishop of Meissen; 1555–1559/1581 | Succeeded by End of the line of bishops, Administrator Johann Leisentrit |
