= Apostolic Vicariate of Saxony =

Latin Catholic pre-diocesan jurisdiction

The Apostolic Vicariate of Saxony (Sachsen in German) was a Latin Church pre-diocesan missionary jurisdiction of the Catholic Church in northern Germany, within the Holy Roman Empire and surviving it, when the Electorate of Saxony became the Kingdom of Saxony.

== History ==
Established in 1743 as Apostolic Vicariate of Saxony (officially "in the hereditary lands of Saxony" or Sächsischen Erblanden) on German territory split off from the vast Apostolic Vicariate of Nordic Missions and from the Apostolic Vicariate of Upper and Lower Saxony, and seated in Dresden. Although its status entitled it to titular bishops, the incumbents until 1800 were not ordained into the episcopate.

The Royal Chaplains (Ober-Hofprediger) of the Sovereigns of Saxony (titled Elector of Saxony, and King of Saxony after 1806) were ex officio the Apostolic Vicars until 1918. The see was the Court Church of Dresden.

In 1831-1920 (except 1842-1845) the Apostolic Vicars were also Deans of the Collegiate Church of Bautzen (and Apostolic Praefects of Lusatia) and so de jure members of the Upper House of the Saxon Parliament (until 1918).

In 1907 the Vicariate had 29 parishes, with 165.000 faithfuls and 64 priests. In 1917 there were 263.000 Catholics in the Kingdom of Saxony, almost 6.000 in Duchy of Saxe-Altenburg e 2.800 in the two principalities Reuss (Reuss-Gera and Reuss-Greiz).

Suppressed on 1921.06.24, its territory being reassigned to (re-)establish a Roman Catholic Diocese of Meißen, the current Diocese of Dresden-Meissen.

== Ordinaries ==
Apostolic Vicars of Saxony

- Father Ludwig Liegeritz, Jesuits (S.J.) (1743–1749)
- Leo Rauch, S.J. (1749–1763)
- Augustin Eggs, S.J. (1763–1764)
- Franz Herz, S.J. (1764–1800)
- Johann Aloys Schneider (1801.01.29 – death 1818.12.22), Titular Bishop of Argos (1801.01.29 – 1818.12.22)
- Ignaz Bernhard Mauermann (1819.01.31 – death 1841.09.14), Titular Bishop of Pella (1819.01.31 – 1841.09.14), also Apostolic Prefect of Lausitz (Lusatia) (Germany) (1831 – 1841.09.14)
- Franz Laurenz Mauermann, Benedictine Order (O.S.B.) (1841.11.26 – death 1845.10.25), Titular Bishop of Ramata (1841.11.26 – 1845.10.25)
- Joseph Dittrich (1846.04.20 – death 1853.10.05), Titular Bishop of Corycus (1846.04.20 – 1853.10.05), also Apostolic Prefect of Lausitz (Lusatia) (1846.04.20 – 1853.10.05)
- Ludwig Forwerk (1854.07.11 – death 1875.01.08), Titular Bishop of Leontopolis in Bithynia (1854.07.11 – 1875.01.08), also Apostolic Prefect of Lausitz (Lusatia) (1854.07.11 – 1875.01.08)
- Franz Bernert (1876.01.28 – death 1890.03.18), Titular Bishop of Azotus (1876.01.28 – 1890.03.18), also Apostolic Prefect of Lausitz (Lusatia) (1876.01.28 – 1890.03.18)
- Ludwig Wahl (1890.07.11 – retired 1900), Titular Bishop of Cocussus (1890.07.11 – 1905.06.06), also Apostolic Prefect of Lausitz (Lusatia) (1890.07.11 – 1900)
- Aloys Schäfer (1906.04.04 – death 1914.09.05), Titular Bishop of Abila (1906.04.04 – 1914.09.05), also Apostolic Prefect of Lausitz (Lusatia) (1906.04.04 – 1914.09.05)
- Franz Löbmann (1915.01.30 – death 1920.12.04), Titular Bishop of Priene (1915.01.30 – 1920.12.04), also Apostolic Prefect of Lausitz (Lusatia) (1915.01.30 – 1920.12.04)
- Apostolic Administrator (1920–1921) Msgr. Jakub Skala, no other office recorded

== Source and External links ==
- GCatholic with incumbent bio links
