= Cathedral of St Peter, Bautzen =

Interdenominational church in Bautzen, Germany

Coordinates: 51°10′57″N 14°25′25″E

Dom St. Petri
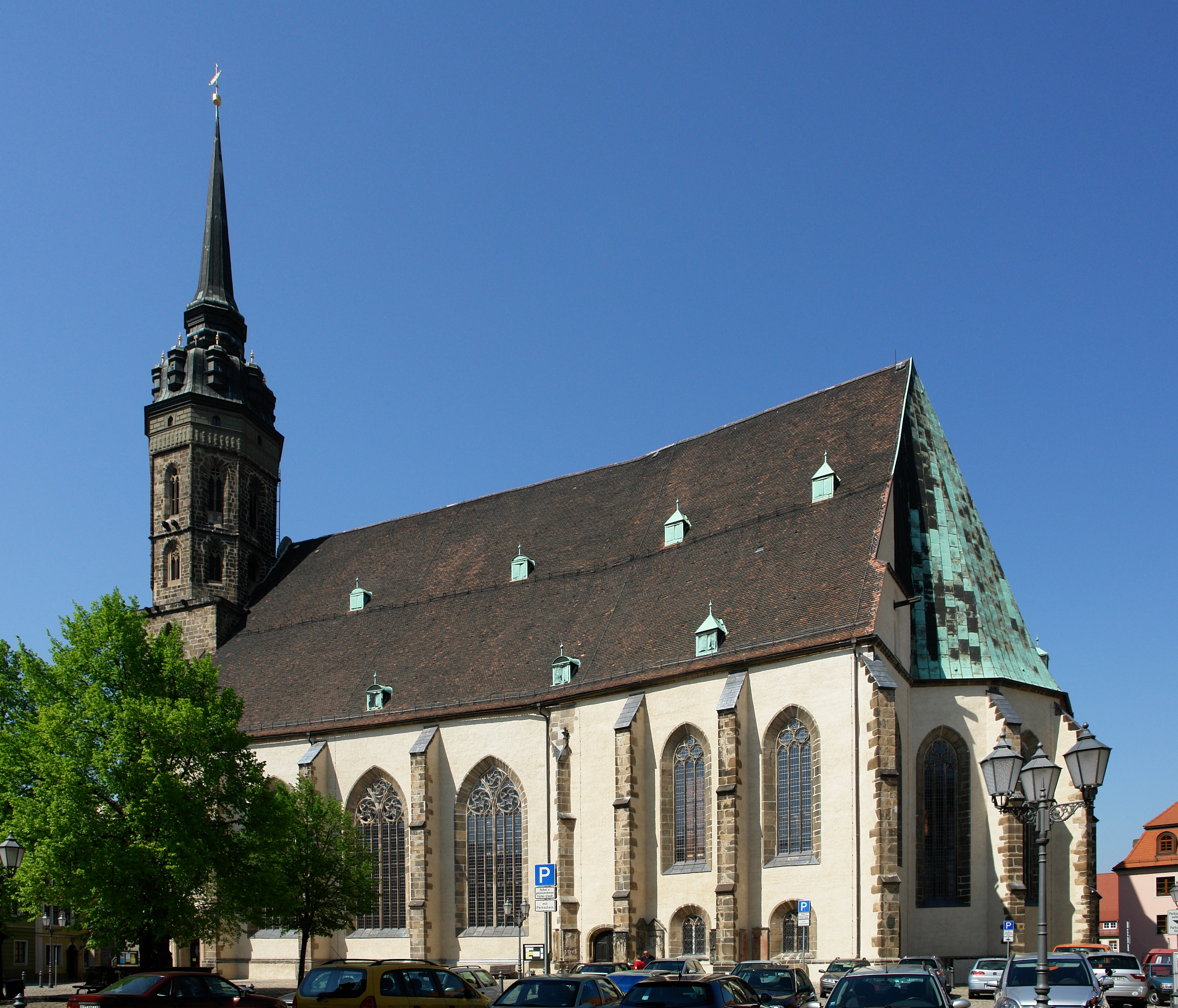

Religion
- Affiliation: Simultaneum: Catholic/Evangelical Lutheran
- District: Diocese of Dresden-Meissen / Evangelical Lutheran Church of Saxony
- Ecclesiastical or organisational status: co-cathedral of the Diocese of Dresden-Meissen / Lutheran parish church
- Year consecrated: 1221
- Status: active

Location
- Location: Bautzen, Germany
- Interactive map of Dom St. Petri

Architecture
- Architect: Maximilian Emil Hehl
- Style: Baroque and Gothic
- Groundbreaking: 1456
- Completed: 1463

Specifications
- Dome height (outer): 40m
- Dome height (inner): 17m
- Spire height: 83m

St. Peter's Cathedral is an interdenominational church in Bautzen (also Budessen), Germany. It is among the oldest and largest simultaneum churches in Germany. Located in the heart of the city's "Old Town", the church and the square it is situated within is a major tourist attraction.

== History ==
=== First Churches ===
The first church was built around the 1000 AD. Near the beginning of the 13th century, a cathedral was built under the supervision of Bishop Bruno II. The Bishop established the Catholic priest foundation at this time as well. This first cathedral was not specifically the Cathedral of St. Peter, as both John the Baptist and St. Peter were the patron saints for the church.

=== Modern Cathedral ===
Between 1456 and 1463, the cathedral that now stands was constructed and named after St. Peter. A fourth nave was added to the original structure. In c. 1560 the Dutch organ builder Hermann Rodensteen built an organ for the cathedral.

A fire devastated much of the city and church in 1634, and the church required a new vault and significant restoration work. The entire interior of the church, with the exception of the original Gothic-style which can still be seen today.

Various cities came to Bautzen to help rebuild the city and Cathedral. Names of many Germanic cities are written on the lintels in the church to commemorate the rebuilding of the cathedral.

The church is a mixture of several different architectural styles, the most prominent being Gothic and Baroque. The early church was entirely a Gothic structure, but it has since been heavily modified. Today, only parts of the interior are Gothic in nature. The Baroque dome was added to the tower in 1664.

=== Simultaneum Era ===
In 1523, an Evangelical Lutheran started preaching in the church. Since 1530, both Catholics and Lutherans have shared the building. A 4-meter (12 ft) tall screen separated the sanctuary. In 1567 the Holy See separated the Lusatian areas outside Saxony from the Saxon parts of the ancient Meissen diocese and established there the Prefecture Apostolic of Meissen (also named as Apostolic Prefecture of Lusatia), seated at St. Peter's of Bautzen, with Johannes Leisentritt as its first prefect. In canon law, an apostolic prefecture is a diocese on approval.

According to its location and its seat the prefecture used to be called alternatively the Apostolic Prefecture of the Two Lusatias (Upper and Lower Lusatia) or Apostolic Prefecture of Bautzen. In 1583, the dean of the cathedral, Leisentrit, ordered that a contract be made between the two sects defining when each would be able to use the cathedral, among other details. This contract is still in effect today and has been only interrupted a few times in history, such as the Bohemian Uprising of 1620 that expelled the Catholics from the building for a short time.

In 1831-1918 the Deans of this Collegiate Church were members de jure of the Upper House of the Parliament of the Kingdom of Saxony.

On 24 June 1921 Pope Benedict XV elevated the Apostolic Prefecture of Meißen to the new Diocese of Meißen by his apostolic constitution Sollicitudo omnium ecclesiarum and thus St. Peter's became the cathedral of that diocese. The 1743-founded Apostolic Vicariate in the Saxon Hereditary Lands, united with the Apostolic Prefecture (and the deanery of this church) since 1831 (except 1842-1844), was dissolved and its area and institutions integrated into the new Meißen diocese in 1921. In 1980 the seat of the diocese was moved to Dresden, leading the diocese to be renamed Dresden-Meissen, and St. Peter's becoming the co-cathedral, besides the Trinity Cathedral in Dresden.

Today, Catholic and Lutheran altars are located on separate sides of the sanctuary. The Catholic high-altar was built in 1723. It was designed by a student of Balthasar Permoser, the same man that designed the Zwinger in Dresden. The altar murals were painted by the Venetian painter Pellegrini.
