= Apostolic Prefecture of Lausitz =

The Apostolic Prefecture of Lausitz (Lusatia) was a missionary pre-diocesan Latin Catholic jurisdiction in Lusatia (in German Lausitz}, today in the northeastern German states of Saxony and Brandenburg and in western Poland).

== History ==
Established in 1559 as Apostolic Prefecture of Lausitz (or Apostolic Prefecture of Meissen before 1743) on territories within the Holy Roman Empire, split off from the Diocese of Meißen (Meissen). In 1581 it gained territory from its suppressed mother Diocese of Meißen.

The Prefecture was de facto united with the Apostolic Vicariate of Saxony since 1846 (and before in 1831-1841), later dissolved and also its area and institutions integrated into the new Meißen diocese in 1921.

The Deans of the Collegiate Church of Bautzen were ex officio Apostolic Praefects of Lusatia, they were de jure members of the Upper House of the Parliament of the Kingdom of Saxony under article 63 of the Constitution of 1831 (until 1918).

In 1910 in Lusatia there were more than 41.000 Catholic faithfuls in 18 parishes.

On 1921.06.24 it was suppressed, its territory being reassigned to re-establish a Diocese of Meißen, the current Diocese of Dresden-Meissen.

== Ordinaries ==
(all Latin Church)

Prefects Apostolic of Lausitz

- Father Johann Leisentrit (1559.08.22 – death 1586.11.24)
- Gregor Leisentrit (1586.12.13 – death 1594.05.23)
- Christoph Blöbel (1594.08.15 – death 1609.02.04)
- August Wiederin von Ottersbach (1609.02.25 – death 1620.06.27)
- Gregor Kathmann von Maurugk (1620.07.09 – death 1644.05.03)
- Johann Hasius von Lichenfeld (1644.09.13 – death 1650.02.28)
- Martin Saudrius von Sternfeld (1650.04.02 – retired 1655)
- Bernhard von Schrattenbach, Cistercians (O. Cist.) (1655 – death 1660.02.26)
- Christophorus Johannes Reinheld von Reichenau (1660.05.11 – death 1665.04.25)
- Peter Franz Longinus von Kieferberg (1665.07.04 – death 1675.11.11)
- Martin Ferdinand Brückner von Brückenstein (1676.05.06 – death 1700.02.01)
- Matthäus Joseph Ignaz Vitzki (1700.12.02 – death 1713.06.23)
- Martin Bernhard Just von Friedenfeld (1714.02.07 – death 1721.06.09)
- Johann Joseph Ignaz Freyschlag von Schmidenthal (1721.11.04 – death 1743.03.02)
- Jakob Johann Joseph Wosky von Bärenstamm (1743.04.04 – death 1771.12.03), Titular Bishop of Pergamus (1753.04.09 – 1771.12.03)
- Carl Laurenz Cardona (1772.01.27 – death 1773.08.25)
- Martin Nugk von Lichtenhoff (1774.01.17 – death 1780.06.21), Titular Bishop of Cisamus (1775.11.15 – 1780.06.21)
- Johann Joseph Schüller von Ehrenthal (1780.10.09 – death 1794.09.14), Titular Bishop of Danaba-orum (1783.07.10 – 1794.09.14)
- Wenzel Kobaltz (1795.05.15 – death 1796.05.02)
- Georg Franz Lock (1801.05.22 – death 1831.09.07), Titular Bishop of Antigonea (1801.05.22 – 1831.09.07)
- Ignaz Bernhard Mauermann (1831 – death 1841.09.14), Titular Bishop of Pella (1819.01.31 – 1841.09.14), while Apostolic Vicar of Saxony (Germany) (1819.01.31 – 1841.09.14)
- Joseph Dittrich (1846.04.20 – death 1853.10.05), Titular Bishop of Corycus (1846.04.20 – 1853.10.05), while Apostolic Vicar of Saxony (Germany) (1846.04.20 – 1853.10.05)
- Ludwig Forwerk (1854.07.11 – death 1875.01.08), Titular Bishop of Leontopolis in Bithynia (1854.07.11 – 1875.01.08), while Apostolic Vicar of Saxony (Germany) (1854.07.11 – 1875.01.08)
- Franz Bernert (1876.01.28 – death 1890.03.18), Titular Bishop of Azotus (1876.01.28 – 1890.03.18), while Apostolic Vicar of Saxony (Germany) (1876.01.28 – 1890.03.18)
- Ludwig Wahl (1890.07.11 – retired 1900), Titular Bishop of Cocussus (1890.07.11 – 1905.06.06), while Apostolic Vicar of Saxony (Germany) (1890.07.11 – 1900)
- Georg Wuschanski (1904.02.13 – death 1905.12.28), Titular Bishop of Samos (1904.02.13 – 1905.12.28)
- Aloys Schaefer (1906.04.04 – death 1914.09.05), Titular Bishop of Abila (1906.04.04 – 1914.09.05), while Apostolic Vicar of Saxony (Germany) (1906.04.04 – 1914.09.05)
- Franz Löbmann (1915.01.30 – death 1920.12.04), Titular Bishop of Priene (1915.01.30 – 1920.12.04), while Apostolic Vicar of Saxony (Germany) (1915.01.30 – 1920.12.04)

== See also ==
- Roman Catholicism in Germany
