= Rodensteen family =

Dutch Organ Builders Family

The Rodensteen family (also given as Raphaëlis, Rottstein, and Rottenstein-Pock) were a Dutch family of organ builders active during the 16th century. Documents from the family's work, particularly those made by Hermann Rodensteen (died 9 July 1583), are some of the most informative and detailed extant documents on 16th century organ building.

The earliest known instrument built by the family was at the St. Peter's Church, Utrecht in the years 1507–1508 by Israel Rodensteen; the oldest known member of the family. Raphael Rodensteen (died 1552 or 1554) built the organ at St. Martin's Church, Bolsward in c.1540. Rapahel's son, Hermann Rodensteen, built several new organs during his lifetime; including organs for the Roskilde Cathedral (1553–1555); the chapel of Copenhagen Castle (1556); St Jakobi, Chemnitz (1559); the Cathedral of St Peter, Bautzen (c1560); St Katharinen, Zwickau (1560–62); the Schlosskirche, Dresden (1563); the Church of Saint Michael, Vienna (c1567); Schloss Augustusburg, near Chemnitz (1570); and the Stadtkirche, Bayreuth (1573) among others. Hermann’s younger brother, Gabriel Rodensteen, worked with his brother on some of the earlier projects, but ultimately established his own independent organ building business.
