= Johannes Leisentritt =

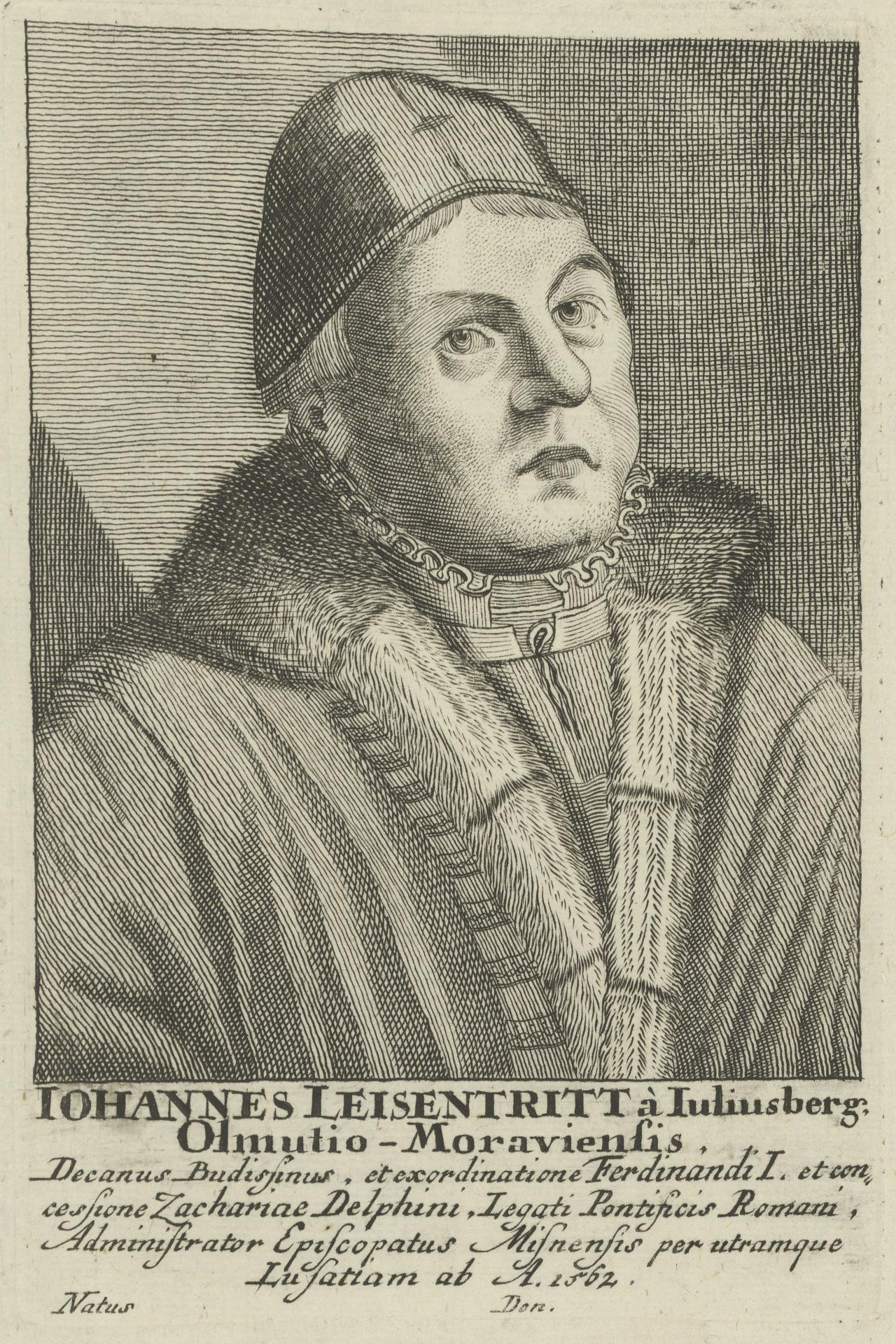
Etching of Johannes Leisentritt from 1562

Johannes Leisentritt, also Johann Leisentrit (May 1527 – 24 November 1586) was a Catholic priest, dean of St. Peter in Bautzen and administrator of the Diocese of Meißen, responsible for Lusatia. He is known for publishing a 1567 hymnal.

== Career ==
Born in Olomouc to a family of craftsmen, Leisentritt studied theology in Kraków and was consecrated as a priest in March 1549. He was from 1559 dean of the collegiate St. Peter in Bautzen. Bishop John IX of Haugwitz made him the Generalkommissar der Ober- und Niederlausitz, responsible for Lusatia, for both Catholics and Protestants. When the Diocese of Meißen became Protestant that year. Leisentritt was appointed by the pope as administrator of the diocese.

Leisentritt died in Bautzen and was buried in St. Peter, the Bautzen Cathedral.

=== Hymnal ===
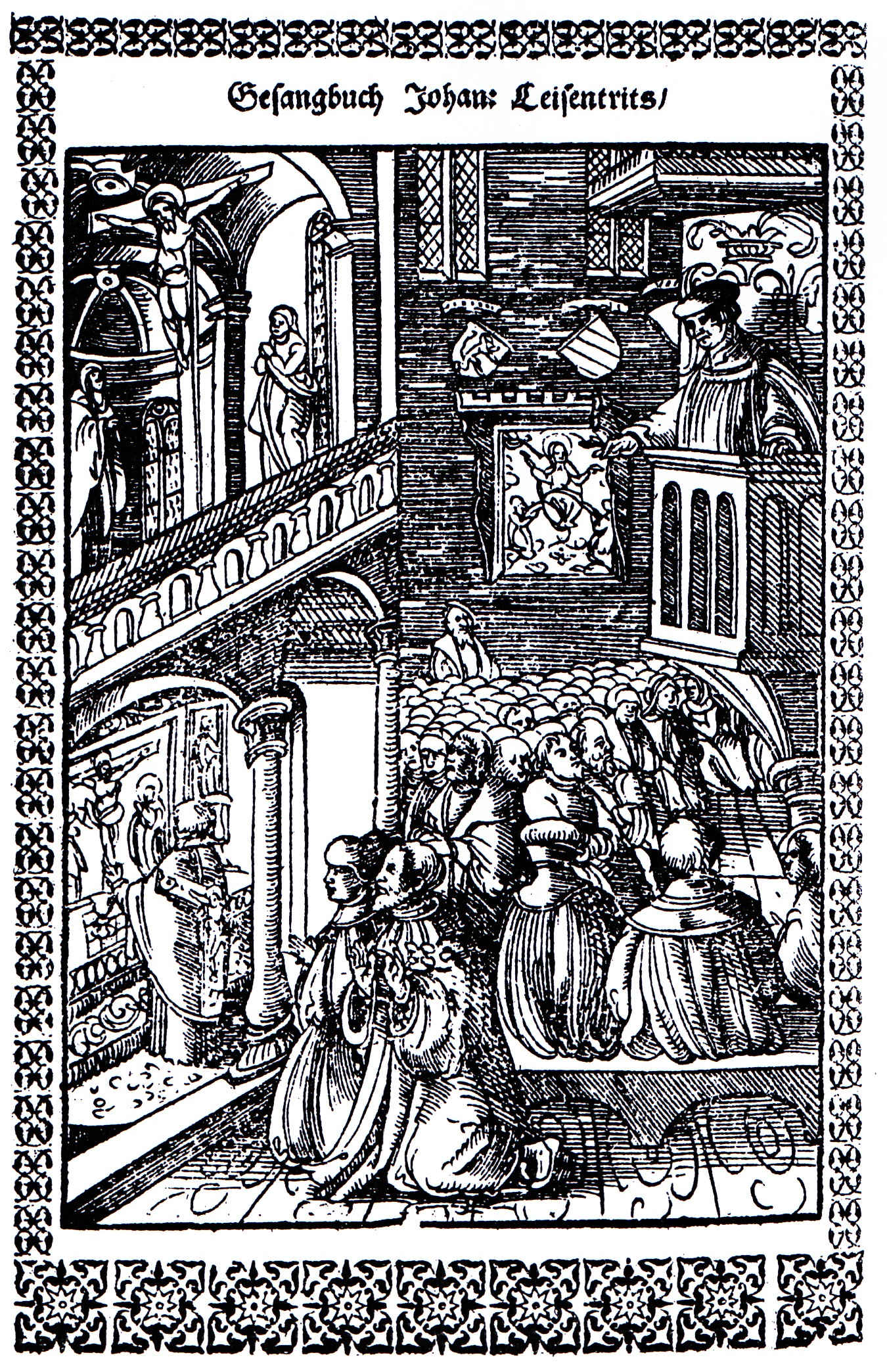
Simultaneous church in Bautzen, Catholic mass left, Protestant sermon right, in Leisentritt's hymnal

Leisentritt is known for the publication of the 1567 hymnal Geistliche Lieder und Psalmen der Alten Apostolischer recht und warglaubiger Christlicher Kirchen (Spiritual songs and psalms of the old apostolic true believers of Christian churches). It is regarded as a substantial hymnal of the Counter Reformation, containing 250 hymns with 181 melodies. Several come from Protestant sources. 70 new songs are probably written by Leisentritt.

== Works ==
- Forma germanico idiomate baptisandi infantes, secundum catholicae ... Ecclesiae ritum cum explicatione Caeremoniarum, quae circa Baptismum fiunt. Budissinae (Bautzen) [1564].
- Geistliche Lieder vnd Psalmen, der alten Apostolischer recht vnd warglaubiger Christlicher Kirchen .... Budissin [1567]. Faksimile-Ausgabe Gesangbuch von 1567. Kassel: Bärenreiter / Leipzig: St. Benno 1966. ISBN 3-7618-0091-6
- Cursus piarum quarundam, vereque evangelicarum precum, quibus per totius Anni circulum omnes Christiani pie vivere volentes, singulos dies salutiferè auspicari, transigere, ... debeant. Budissinae 1571.
- Catholisch Pfarbuch oder Form und Weise, wie die catholischen Seelsorger in Ober und Niderlausitz ... ihre Krancken ... besüchen, ... zur ... Büß, und ... entpfahung des Heiligen Sacrament des Altars ... vermanen, ... in todtes nöten ... trösten; mit nachfolgung einer Catholischen Protestation wider alle Ketzereyen... Köln 1578.
- Catholisch Gesangbuch, voller geistlicher Lieder und Psalmen ... so ... mögen ... gesungen werden ... (2 Teile) Budissin 1584.

== Literature ==
- L[actantius] Joannes Codicius: De reverendo atque celeberrimo viro, Domino Ioanne Leisentritio, Olomvcensi, in Collegiatae Ecclesiae Bvdissinen: Decanvm Electo. & C. Elegia. [Bautzen] 1559. (Bericht über die Wahl Leisentrits zum Domdekan und seine Amtseinführung in Bautzen)
- Konrad Ameln (1985). "Leisentrit, Johannes". Neue Deutsche Biographie (in German). Vol. 14. Berlin: Duncker & Humblot. p. 156. (full text online).
- Franz Schnorr von Carolsfeld (1883). "Johannes Leisentritt". Allgemeine Deutsche Biographie (in German). Vol. 18. Leipzig: Duncker & Humblot. pp. 221–223.
- Walter Gerblich: Leisentrit und die Administratur des Bistums Meißen in den Lausitzen. Görlitz 1931. reprint Leipzig 1959 (Erfurter Theol. Studien, vol. 4).
- Erika Heitmeyer: Das Gesangbuch von Johann Leisentrit 1567: Adaption als Merkmal von Struktur und Genese früher deutscher Gesangbuchlieder. St. Ottilien: EOS-Verlag 1988. (Pietas liturgica: Studia 5), zugl.: Osnabrück, Univ., Diss., 1987. ISBN 3-88096-265-0
- Walther Lipphardt: Leisentrits Gesangbuch von 1567. Leipzig 1964. (Studien zur kath. Bistums- und Klostergeschichte Bd. 5),
- Michael Mages: Leisentrit, Johann. In: Wolfgang Herbst (ed.): Wer ist wer im Gesangbuch? Vandenhoeck & Ruprecht, 2001, ISBN 3-525-50323-7, pp 195–196 (, p. 195, at Google Books).
- Martin Persch (1992). "Leisentrit, Johannes". In Bautz, Traugott (ed.). Biographisch-Bibliographisches Kirchenlexikon (BBKL) (in German). Vol. 4. Herzberg: Bautz. cols. 1396–1398. ISBN 3-88309-038-7.
- Siegfried Seifert (ed.): Johann Leisentrit, 1527 - 1586. Zum vierhundertsten Todestag. Leipzig 1987

== Bibliography ==
- "Diocese of Dresden-Meissen: Historical Details". The Hierarchy of the Catholic Church: Current and historical information about its bishops and dioceses.
