= Diocese of Dresden–Meissen =

Catholic diocese in Germany

Diocese of Dresden-Meissen Dioecesis Dresdensis-Misnensis Bistum Dresden-Meißen

Catholic
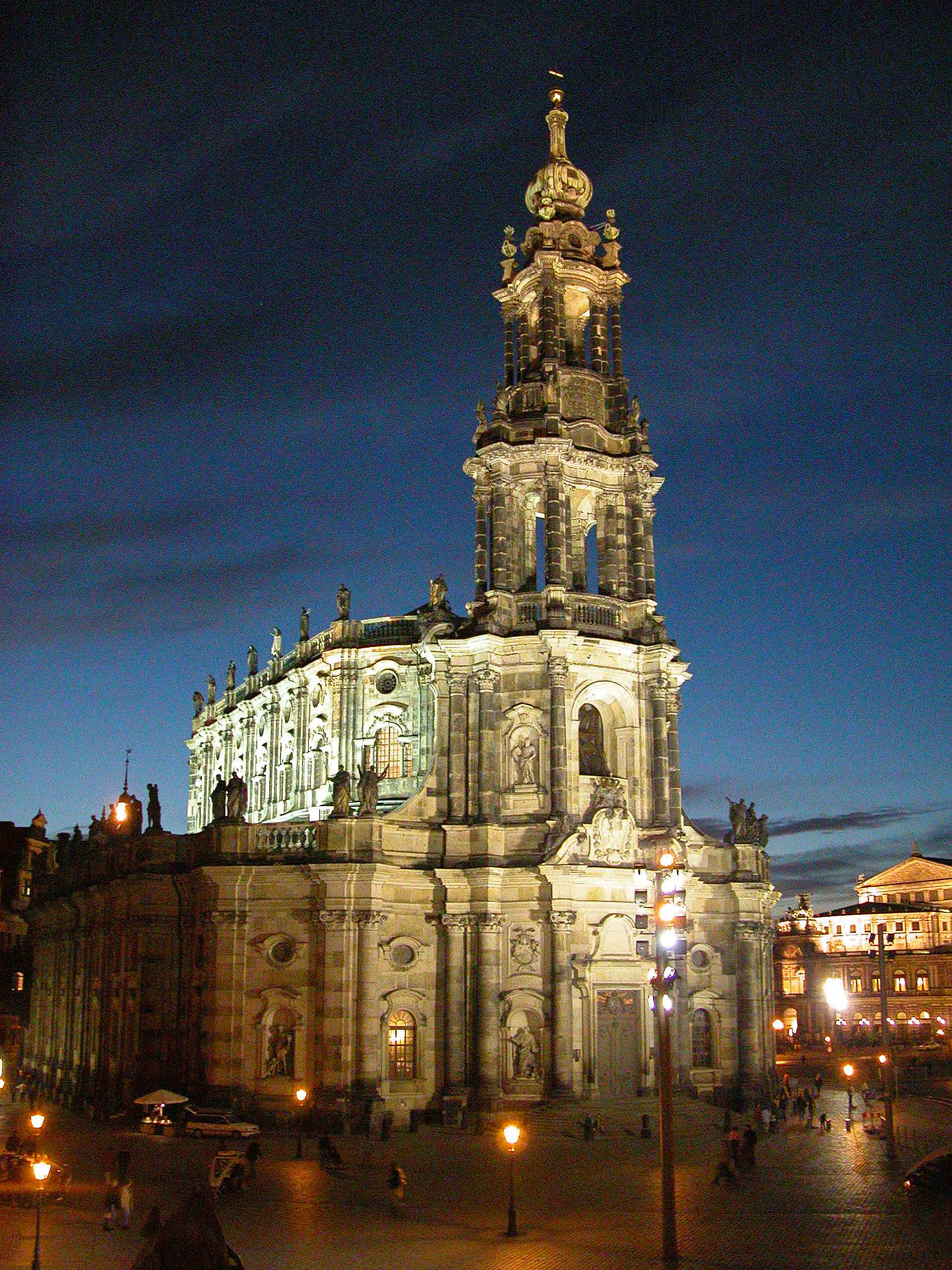
- Dresden Cathedral

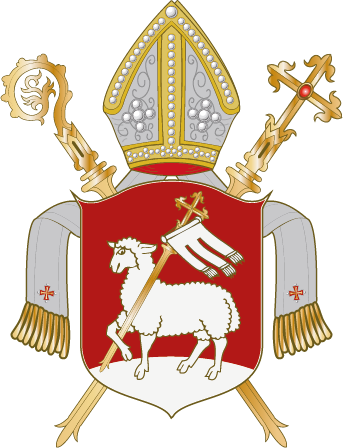
- Coat of arms

Location
- Country: Germany
- Ecclesiastical province: Berlin
- Metropolitan: Berlin

Statistics
- Area: 16,934 km^{2} (6,538 sq mi)
- Population: Total; Catholics: (as of 2021); 4,085,026; 139,269 (3.4%)
- Parishes: 37

Information
- Denomination: Catholic
- Sui iuris church: Latin Church
- Rite: Roman Rite
- Established: 968 Founded as the Bishopric of Meissen; 24 June 1921 as Diocese of Meissen; 15 November 1979 renamed Diocese of Dresden-Meissen
- Cathedral: Katholische Hofkirche, Dresden
- Co-cathedral: St. Peter's, Bautzen
- Patron saint: St. Benno of Meissen; Donatus of Arezzo; Afra of Augsburg
- Secular priests: 155 (Diocesan); 38 (Religious Orders); 14 Permanent Deacons

Current leadership
- Pope: Leo XIV
- Bishop: Heinrich Timmerevers; Bishop of Dresden-Meissen
- Metropolitan Archbishop: Heiner Koch
- Bishops emeritus: Joachim Reinelt

Map
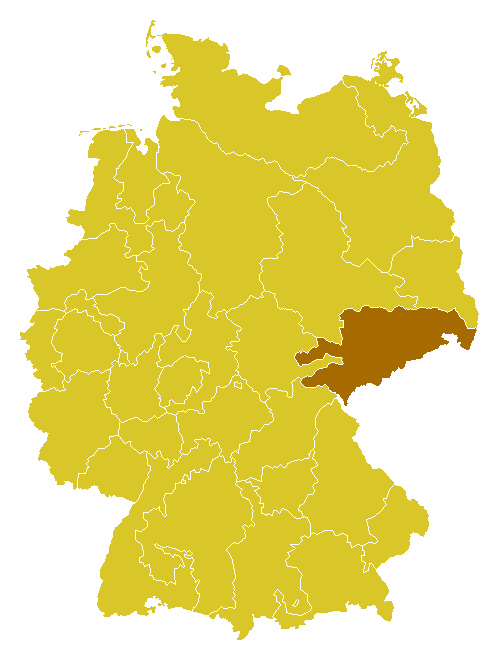

Website
- bistum-dresden-meissen.de

The Diocese of Dresden–Meissen (Latin: Dioecesis Dresdensis–Misnensis; German: Bistum Dresden–Meißen) is a Latin Church diocese of Catholic Church in Germany with its seat in Dresden. It is suffragan to the Archdiocese of Berlin.

Founded as the Bishopric of Meissen (German: Bistum Meißen) in 968, it was dissolved in 1539 during the Protestant Reformation. The diocese was reestablished in 1921 and renamed Dresden–Meissen in 1980. Today its central church is Dresden Cathedral, the former Catholic Church of the Court of Saxony Sanctissimae Trinitatis built from 1739 until 1755 under Elector Frederick Augustus II, and its patron saint is Benno of Meissen.

== History ==
=== Ancient See of Meissen ===
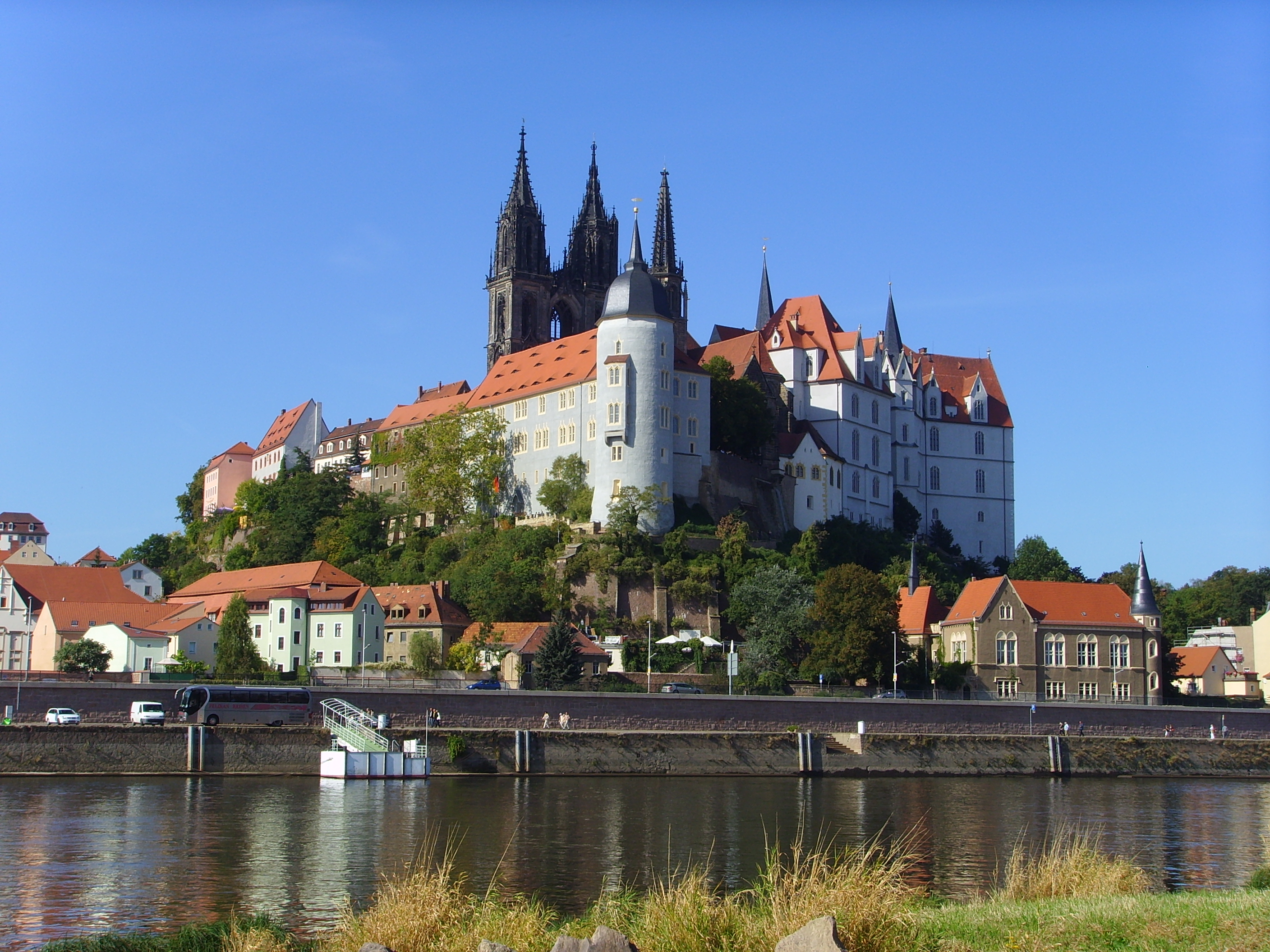
Meissen castle and cathedral

The modern city of Meissen owes its origin to a castle built by King Henry I the Fowler about 928 to protect German colonists among the pagan Wends. To insure the success of the Christian missions, Otto I suggested at the Roman Synod of 962 the creation of an archiepiscopal see at Magdeburg. Pope John XII consented, and shortly before the execution of the plan in 968 it was decided at the Synod of Ravenna (967) to create three bishoprics — Meissen, Merseburg, and Zeitz — as suffragans of the Archbishopric of Magdeburg. The year in which the Diocese of Meissen was established is disputed, as the oldest extant records may be forgeries; however, the record of endowment by Otto I in 971 is genuine.

The first bishop, Burchard (died 969), established a foundation (monasterium) which in the course of the 11th century developed a chapter of canons. In 1346 the diocese stretched from the Ore Mountains and Iser Mountains in the south, from there northwards downstream the Queis and Bober rivers, forming the eastern boundary, in the north downstream the Oder to the junction of the Lusatian Neisse and on along the Oder, then crossing to the middle course of the Spree in the northwest. It embraced the five provostries of Meissen, Riesa, Wurzen, Grossenhain and Bautzen, the four archdeaneries of Nisani (Meissen), Chemnitz, Zschillen (Wechselburg) and Lower Lusatia, and the two deaneries of Meissen and Bautzen. Poorly endowed in the beginning, it appears to have acquired later large estates under Otto III and Henry II.

The chief task of the bishops of the new see was the conversion of the Wends, to which Bishops Volkold (died 992) and Eido (died 1015) devoted themselves with great zeal; but the slow evangelization was yet incomplete when the investiture conflict threatened to arrest it effectively. Saint Benno (1066–1106), bishop when these troubles were most serious, was appointed by Henry IV and appears to have been in complete accord with the emperor until 1076; in that year, although he had taken no part in the Great Saxon Revolt, he was imprisoned by Henry for nine months. Escaping, he joined the Saxon princes, espoused the cause of Pope Gregory VII, and in 1085 took part in the Gregorian Synod of Quedlinburg, for which he was deprived of his office by the emperor, a more imperially disposed bishop being appointed in his place. On the death of Gregory, Benno made peace with Henry, was reappointed to his former see in 1086, and devoted himself entirely to missionary work among the Slavs.

Among his successors, Herwig (died 1119) sided with the pope, Godebold with the emperor. In the 13th century the pagan Wends were finally converted to Christianity, chiefly through the efforts of the great Cistercian monasteries, the most important of which were Dobrilugk and Neuzelle. Major convents of nuns include Heiligenkreuz (English: Holy Cross) at Meissen, Marienthal near Zittau, Marienstern on the White Elster, and Mühlberg (Marienstern Abbey).

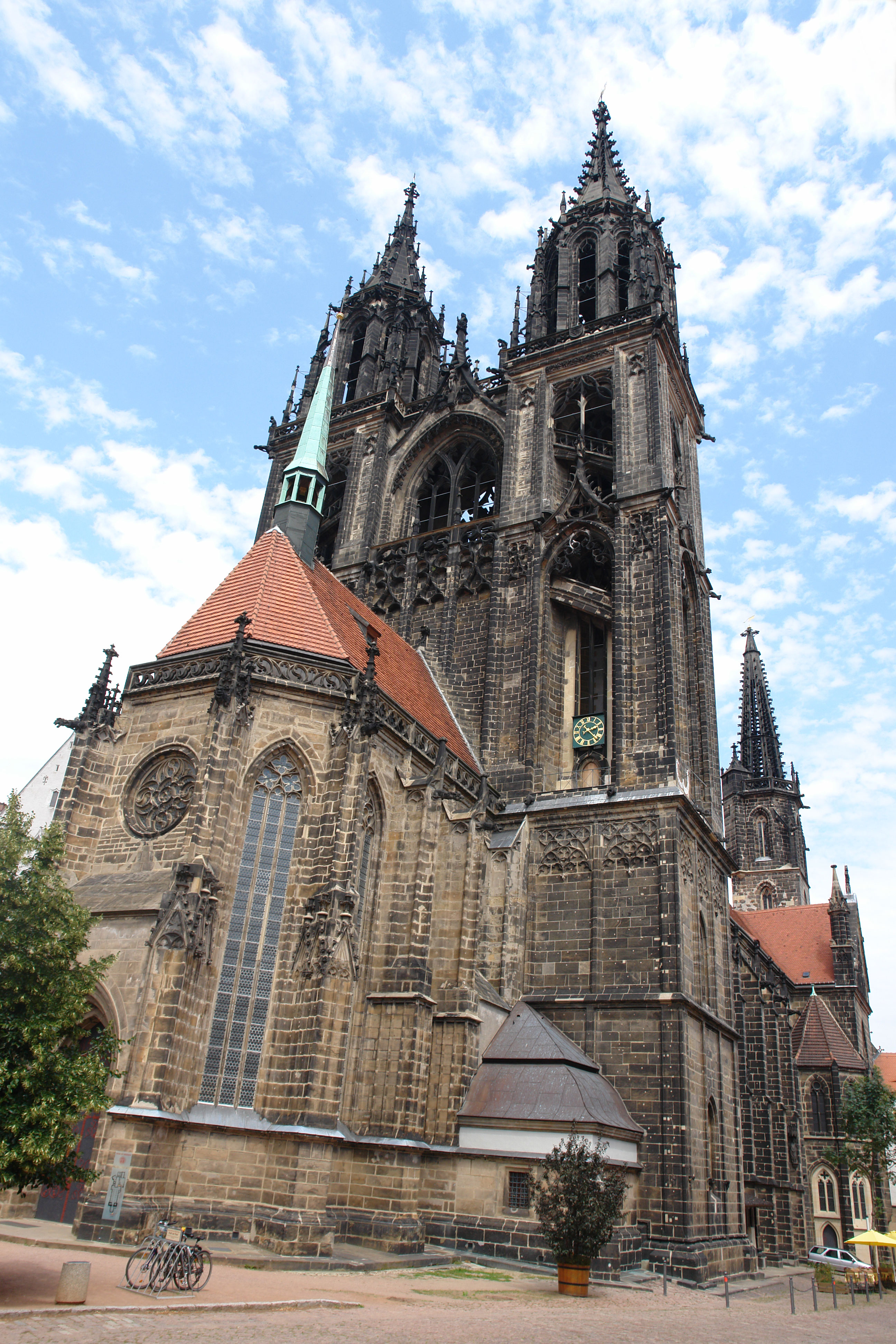
The then Cathedral of Ss. John the Evangelist and Donatus in Meissen, now a Lutheran church.

Among the later bishops, who ranked after the 13th century as prince-bishops (Fürsten) of the Holy Roman Empire, however, again and again disputed in that position by the Margraves of Meissen, the most notable are Wittigo I (1266–1293) and John I of Eisenberg (1340–1371). The former began the magnificent Gothic cathedral in Meissen, in which are buried nine princes of the margravial House of Wettin; the latter, as notary and intimate friend of the Margrave of Meissen, afterwards the Emperor Charles IV, protected the interests of his church and increased the revenues of the diocese. During the latter's administration, in 1344, Prague was made an archiepiscopal see.

In 1365 Pope Urban V appointed the archbishop of Prague legatus natus, or perpetual representative of the Holy See, for the dioceses of Meissen, Bamberg and Regensburg (Ratisbon); the opposition of Magdeburg made it impossible to exercise in Meissen the privileges of this office, and Meissen remained, though under protest, subject to the jurisdiction of the Metropolitan of Magdeburg. John's successor, John II of Jenstein (1376-9), who resigned Meissen on his election to the see of Prague, Nicholas I (1379–1392), John III (1393-8), and Thimo of Colditz (1399–1410), were appointed directly from Rome, which set aside the elective rights of the cathedral chapter. Thimo, a Bohemian by birth, neglected the diocese and ruined it financially.

William I, Margrave of Meissen prevailed on Pope Boniface IX in 1405 to free Meissen from the authority of the Magdeburg metropolitan and to place it as an exempt diocese directly under the Holy See. The illustrious Bishop Rudolf von der Planitz (1411–1427), through wise regulations and personal sacrifices, brought order out of chaos. The Hussite Wars caused great damage to the diocese, then ruled over by John IV Hofmann (1427–1451); under the government of the able brothers Caspar (1451–1463) and Dietrich of Schönberg (1461–76), it soon recovered and on Dietrich's death there was a fund of 8,800 gold forms in the episcopal treasury. John V of Weißenbach (1476–1487), through his mania for building and his travels, soon spent this money and left a heavy burden of debt on the diocese. John VI of Salhausen (1488–1518) further impoverished the diocese through his obstinate attempt to obtain full princely sovereignty in the temporal territories ruled by his see, which brought him into constant conflict with George, Duke of Saxony; his spiritual administration was also open to censure.

John VII of Schleinitz (1518–1537) was a resolute opponent of Martin Luther, whose revolt began in neighbouring Wittenberg, and, conjointly with George of Saxony, endeavored to crush the innovations. The canonization of Benno (1523), urged by him, was intended to offset the progress of the Lutheran teaching. John VIII of Maltitz (1537–1549) and Nicholas II of Carlowitz (1549–1555) were unable to withstand the ever-spreading Protestant Reformation, which after the death of Duke George (1539) triumphed in Saxony and gained ground even among the canons of the cathedral, so that the diocese was on the verge of dissolution.

The last bishop, John of Haugwitz (1555–1581), placed his resignation in the hands of the cathedral chapter, in virtue of an agreement with Elector Augustus of Saxony, went over to Lutheranism, married and retired to the castle of Ruhetal near Mögeln. The electors of Saxony took over the administration of the temporalities of the diocese within the Electorate of Saxony which in 1666 were finally adjudged to them. The canons turned Protestant, and all remaining monasteries in Saxony were secularized, their revenues and buildings being devoted principally to educational works.

=== Apostolic Prefecture of Meissen ===
Before his resignation and conversion Haugwitz appointed Johannes Leisentritt as diocesan administrator, seated in Bautzen, competent for the Lusatian areas of the diocese outside of Saxony. Leisentritt failed to win the pope for establishing a new diocese comprising only the Lusatian areas of Meißen bishopric. However, in 1567 the Holy See separated the Lusatian areas from the Saxon parts of the diocese and established there the Apostolic Prefecture of Meißen, seated at St. Peter's in Bautzen, with Leisentritt as its first prefect. In canon law an apostolic prefecture is a missionary district or diocese on approval.

According to its location and its seat the prefecture used to be called alternatively the Apostolic Prefecture of the Two Lusatias (Upper and Lower Lusatia) or Apostolic Prefecture of Bautzen. The then liege lord of the Two Lusatias, the Catholic king of Bohemia (in personal union Holy Roman Emperor) did not effectively offend the spreading of the Reformation in the Two Lusatias. So it depended on the local vassals if Protestantism prevailed or not. When in 1635 the Lutheran Electorate of Saxony annexed the Two Lusatias it guaranteed in the cession contract (Traditionsrezess) with Bohemia to leave the existing religious relations untouched. As a signatory of the Peace of Westphalia of 1648 Saxony later agreed to maintain the religious status quo as given in the reference year of 1624 in all its territories acquired since.

After the Prussian annexation of Lower Lusatia (then assigned to Brandenburg) and eastern Upper Lusatia, the latter then integrated into Silesia, the Holy See assigned the Lower Lusatian and eastern Upper Lusatian areas of the prefecture of Meißen to the Prussian Prince-Bishopric of Breslau in 1821 (Bull De salute animarum). The remaining prefecture, which had maintained a strong Catholic identity, used to be also called since the Apostolic Prefecture of (Saxon) Upper Lusatia.

=== The new Diocese of Meissen ===
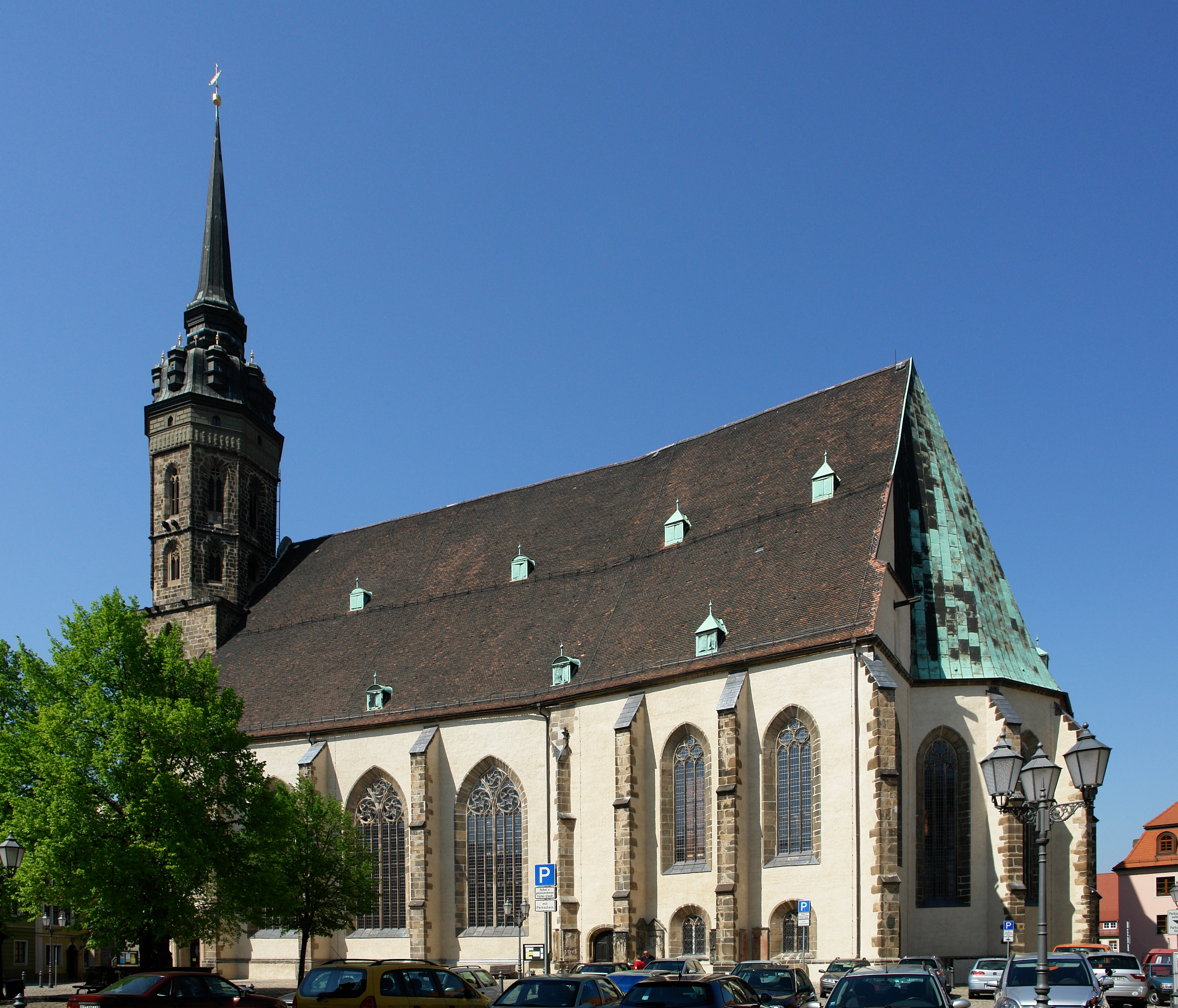
The then Cathedral of St. Peter in Bautzen, cocathedral since 1980.

On 24 June 1921 Pope Benedict XV suppressed the Apostolic Prefecture of Lusatia to refound the Diocese of Meißen by his apostolic constitution Sollicitudo omnium ecclesiarum and the former's seat in Bautzen thus became the seat of the diocese. In 1743 the Holy See had established the Apostolic Vicariate in the Saxon Hereditary Lands (German: Apostolisches Vikariat in den Sächsischen Erblanden), seated in Dresden (and including the historic seat of Meißen), competent for the Catholic diaspora in the rest of Saxony without Lusatia and, after 1874, in three neighbouring principalities (Saxe-Altenburg, Reuss elder and Younger Line, which are now part of Thuringia). The vicariate was de facto united with the apostolic prefecture of Lusatia since 1846 (and before in 1831-1841), later dissolved and also its area and institutions integrated into the new Meißen diocese in 1921.

In the years between 1945 and 1948 the number of parishioners in the Meißen diocese more than doubled because many Catholic refugees and expellees from former Eastern Germany and Czechoslovakia found refuge within its diocesan area. So many new parishes were established in the following years. Four Catholic parishes in Saxony east of the Lusatian Neisse, whose parishioners had fled or were expelled by the authorities of annexing Poland, were lost. On 24 January 1948 Bishop Petrus Legge conveyanced his jurisdiction for that Polish-annexed diocesan area to Karol Milik, the apostolic administrator of that part of the Breslau archdiocese outside of the Soviet Occupation Zone in Germany, which had also been annexed to Poland. When in 1972 Pope Paul VI reduced the diocesan area of the Archdiocese of Wrocław to Polish territory only by the apostolic constitution Vratislaviensis - Berolinensis et aliarum also the Polish-annexed Meißen diocesan area became officially a part of that archdiocese. The then East German part of Breslau archdiocese was disentangled by the same apostolic constitution and became the exempt new Apostolic Administration of Görlitz.

=== The renamed Diocese of Dresden-Meissen ===
In 1980 the seat of the diocese was moved to Dresden, leading the diocese to be renamed Dresden-Meissen. Since 1994 the three formerly exempt jurisdictions of Berlin, Dresden-Meißen, and Görlitz form the new ecclesiastical province of Berlin with the latter as metropolitan see.

== Territory ==
The area of the bishopric covers the Free State of Saxony, except for the former Prussian territory in Upper Lusatia (around Görlitz and Hoyerswerda), and adjacent parts of Thuringia (former territories of Saxe-Altenburg, Reuss-Gera, and Reuss-Greiz). It is subdivided into nine deaneries:

- Bautzen
- Chemnitz
- Dresden
- Gera
- Leipzig
- Meißen
- Plauen
- Zittau
- Zwickau

== See also ==
- Bishop of Dresden-Meissen
- Roman Catholicism in Germany
