= Saukrieg =

1555–1558 feud in Saxony, Germany

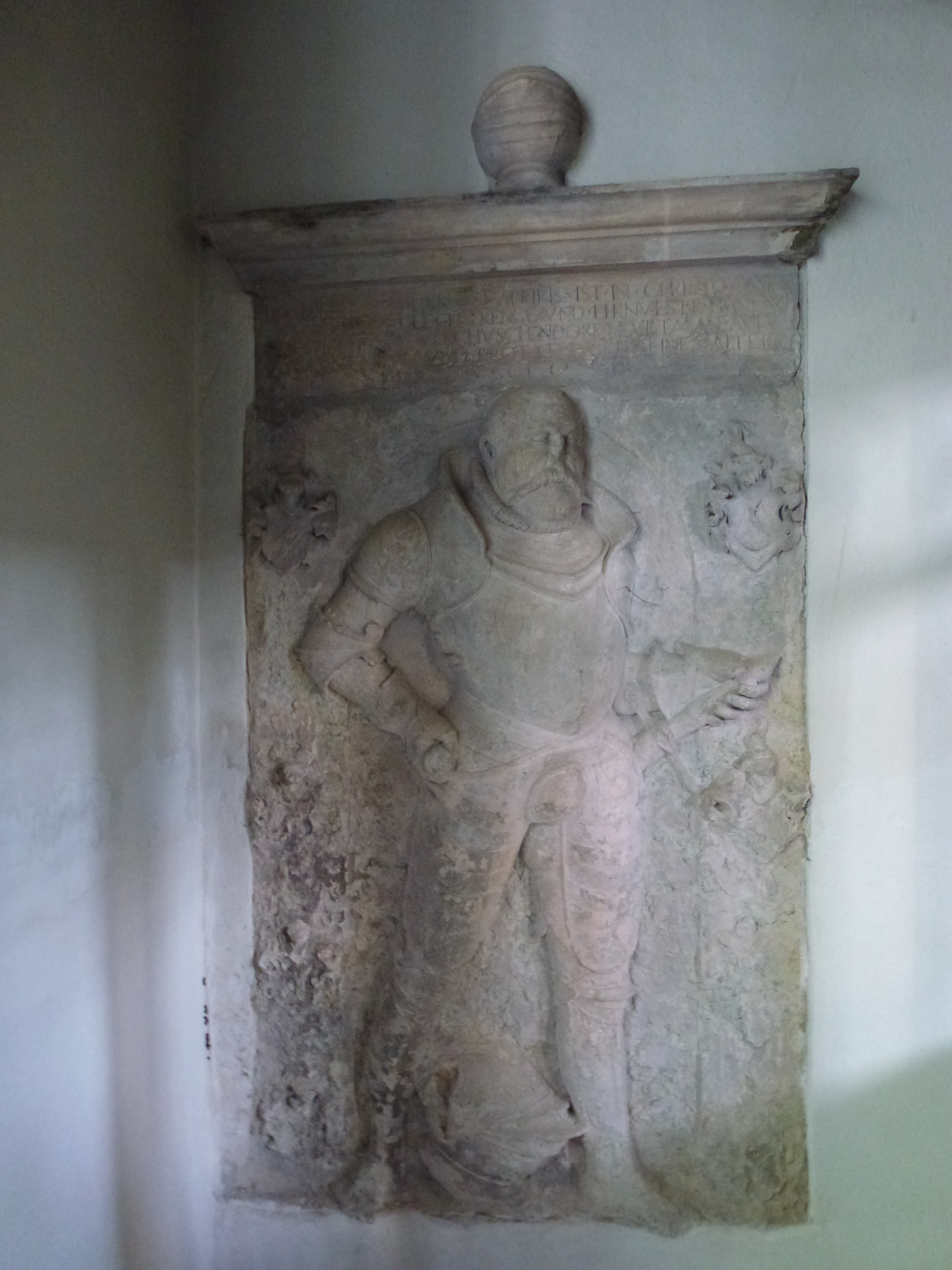
Grave sculpture of the main initiator of the feud, John of Carlowitz

The so-called Saukrieg ("Pig War") of 1555–1558 was a feud between John of Carlowitz and Zuschendorf and the Bishop of Meißen, John IX of Haugwitz. During the course of the feud, Carlowitz had 700 pigs, belonging to the bishop's subjects, driven away in order to pursue his claims, which explains the rather unusual name of the feud. The Saukrieg has been described as the last feud "in the spirit of the Middle Ages".

In 1555 the brother of John of Carlowitz, Nicolas II of Carlowitz, Bishop of Meißen, died. He was succeeded by Bishop John IX of Haugwitz. Because of the bishop's inheritance, a dispute arose between him and the dead brother's sons, in particular John of Carlowitz and Zuschendorf.

The Carlowitzes feuded with the new bishop and hunted him out of his residenz at Stolpen. A small body of armed men invaded the villages around Stolpen and Wurzen and caused considerable damage. According to tradition, 700 pasturing swine were alleged to have been driven off.

In 1558, because there was no longer anywhere in his estate where the bishop was safe, he had to flee from his enemy to Prague. Finally the dispute was mediated by Prince-Elector Augustus. According to the settlement agreed, John of Carlowitz was reputedly given 4,000 gulden from the bishop for expenses incurred. With that, the last feud in Saxony came to an end.

In St. Mary's Church, Dohna, is a tomb with a sculpture of the main instigator of this feud, the knight, Sir John of Carlowitz, whose noble line were vassals of the burgraves of Dohna until the downfall of the Burgraviate of Dohna.

== Sources ==
- _ (1847), Conversations-Lexikon, Vol. 12, 9th edn. Leipzig: Brockhaus.
- Weber, Carl Julius (1836). Das Ritter-Wesen und die Templer, Johanniter und Marianer oder Deutsch-Ordens-Ritter. Stuttgart: Hallberger.
- Max Winkler und Hermann Raußendorf: Die Burggrafenstadt Dohna. In: Mitteilungen des Landesvereins Sächsischer Heimatschutz. Vol. 25, H. 1-4, Dresden 1936 Record at the German National Library. Darin: "Saukrieg".
- J. G. Ersch, J. G. Gruber: Allgemeine Encyclopädie der Wissenschaft und Künste in vols. 21-22. Leipzig 1830. p. 19 Saukrieg (digitalised)
- O. Ludwig, B. Wolff: Neues elegantes Konversations-Lexikon für Gebildete aus allen Ständen, Vol. 4, Leipzig 1837. p. 175 Saukrieg (digitalised)
- Ziehnert, Widar (1839). Sachsen's Volkssagen: Balladen, Romanzen und Legenden, Volume 3. Annaberg: Rudolph & Dieterici.
