= Ramatha =

Ramatha (Rama, Ramata) is the name of a former Roman Catholic titular bishopric in Palestine.

It was never an episcopal see properly so called, but, in the Middle Ages, the crusaders established in their Kingdom of Jerusalem the Diocese of Lydda and Rama, the titular of which was generally called Bishop of Rama, i.e. of Ramla, a town near Lydda, but more populous than the latter.

Later this was forgotten and there was a titular bishopric of Lydda, as well as the titular see of Rama or Ramatha; the mistake has been discovered and rectified by its suppression in 1884 by the Roman Curia.
