= Dresden Cathedral =

Catholic cathedral in Dresden, Germany

- The Cathedral of the Holy Trinity
- The Catholic Church of the Royal Court of Saxony
- Katholische Hofkirche (German)
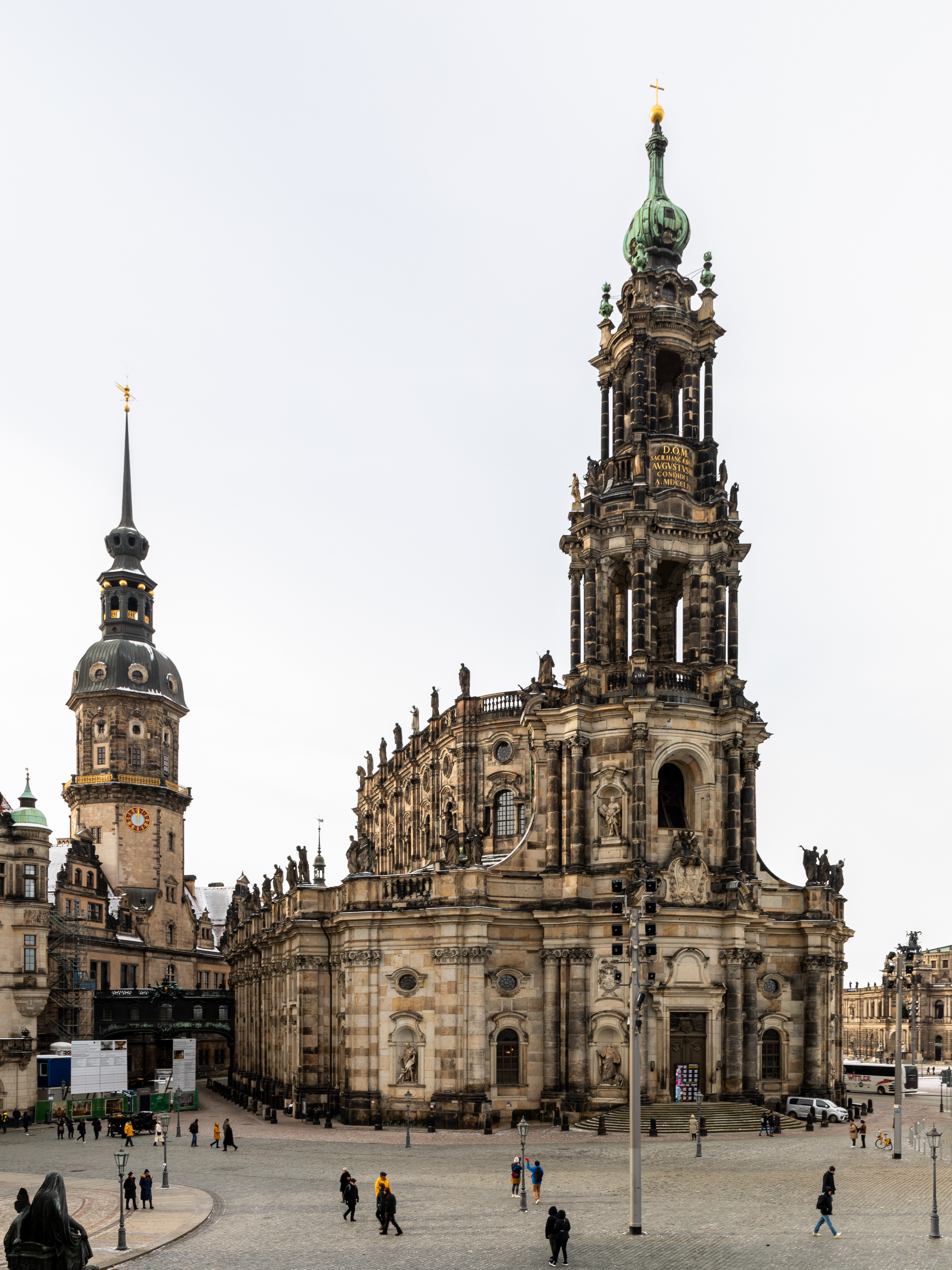
- Katholische Hofkirche, 2023
- Dresden Cathedral
- 51°03′13″N 13°44′15″E
- Location: Dresden
- Country: Germany
- Denomination: Catholic Church
- Sui iuris church: Latin Church

History
- Status: Active
- Founded: 1739
- Founder: Augustus III of Poland
- Consecrated: 29 June 1751

Architecture
- Functional status: Cathedral
- Architect: Gaetano Chiaveri
- Completed: 1755

Administration
- Province: Berlin
- Diocese: Dresden-Meissen

Clergy
- Bishop: Heiner Koch

Dresden Cathedral, or the Cathedral of the Holy Trinity, Dresden, previously the Catholic Church of the Royal Court of Saxony, called in German Katholische Hofkirche and since 1980 also known as Kathedrale Sanctissimae Trinitatis, is the Catholic Cathedral of Dresden.

Always the most important Catholic church of the city, it was elevated to the status of cathedral of the Diocese of Dresden–Meissen in 1964. It is located near the Elbe river in the historic center of Dresden, Germany.

It is one of the burial sites of the House of Wettin, including Polish monarchs.

== History ==
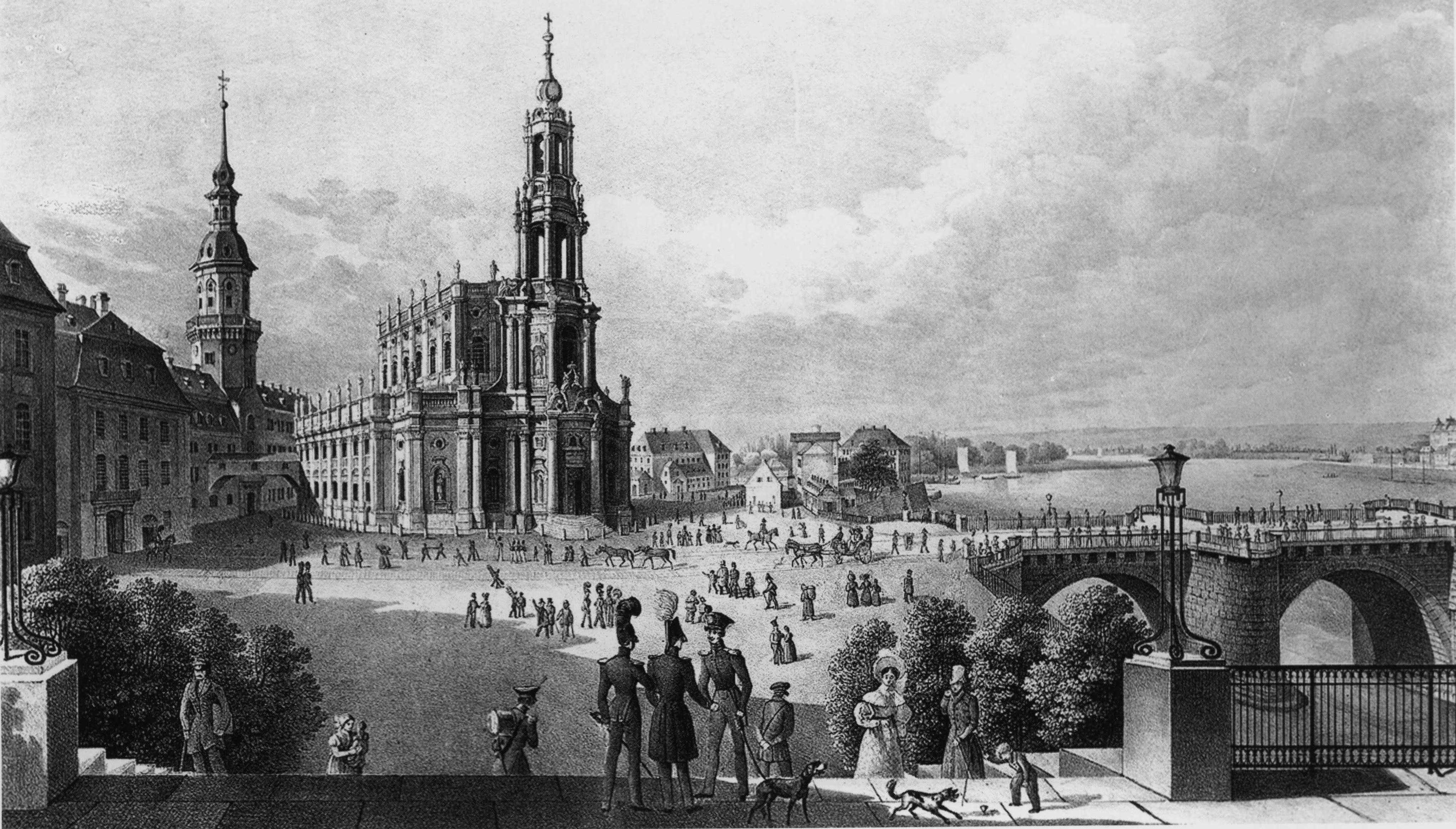
The church around 1840

The Hofkirche stands as one of Dresden's foremost landmarks. It was designed by architect Gaetano Chiaveri from 1738 to 1751. The church was commissioned by Augustus III, Elector of Saxony and King of Poland while the Protestant city of Dresden built the Frauenkirche (Church of Our Lady) between 1726 and 1743. While the general population of the city was Protestant, its rulers were Catholic. The Catholic Elector built the cathedral for his own use and for the use of other high-ranking officials, connecting it to his home, Dresden Castle, with an ornate high level walkway.

Since 1743 the Deans (Hofprediger) of the Court Church were ex officio also Apostolic Vicars of the Saxon hereditary lands.

The church was badly damaged in February 1945 during the bombing of Dresden in the Second World War. The building was restored by the year 1962 by the East German government. It was further restored in the early 21st century following reunification, including the rebuilding of the bridge to the castle. Today it is the cathedral of the Diocese of Dresden-Meissen. Free entry is permitted during the daytime.

The cathedral features a carefully restored organ, the last work of the renowned organ builder Gottfried Silbermann. It also contains a Rococo pulpit by Balthasar Permoser.

== Burials ==
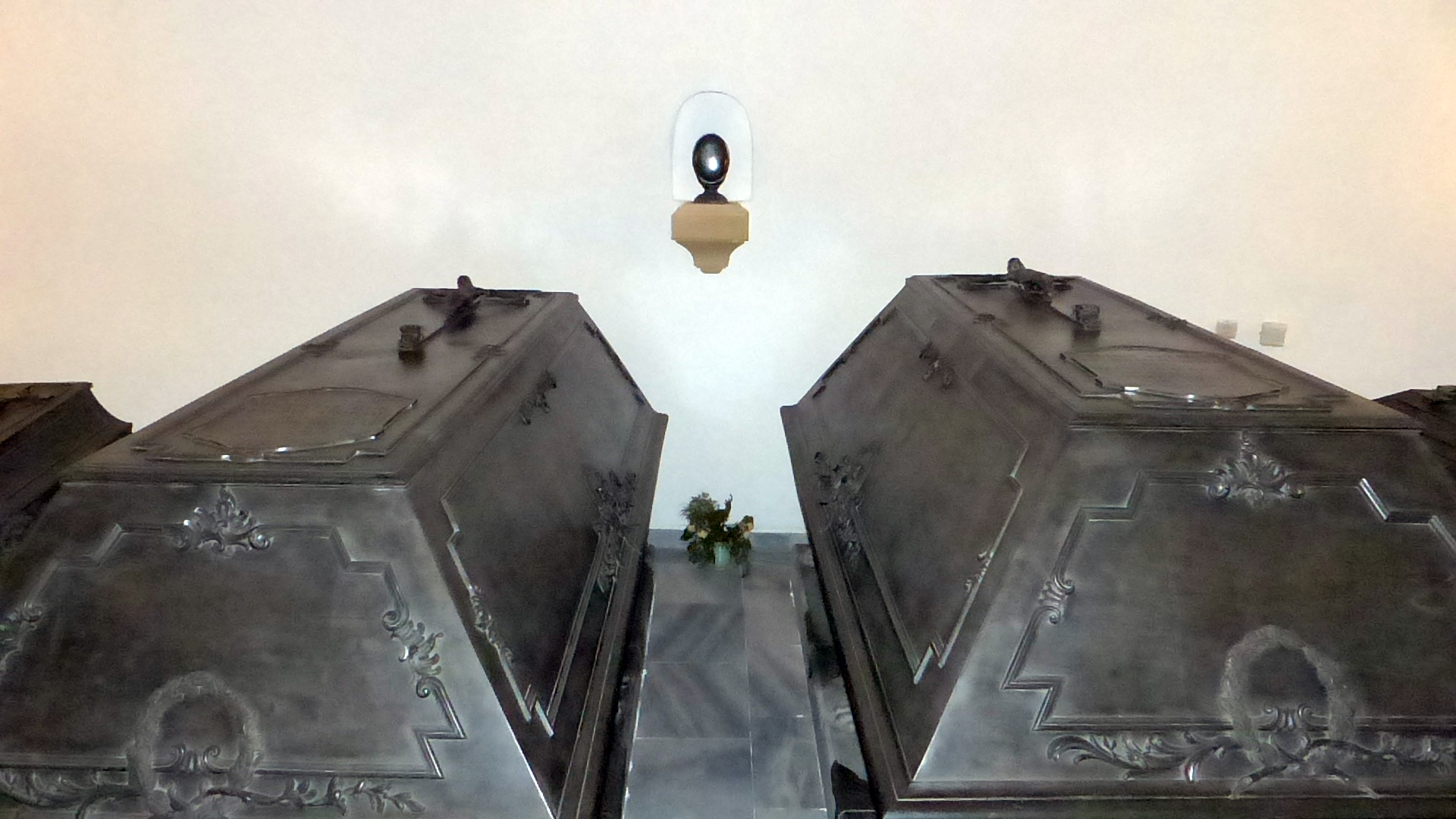
Tombs of King Augustus III of Poland and Queen Maria Josepha

In the crypts the heart of King Augustus the Strong is buried along with the last King of Saxony and the remains of 49 other members of the Wettin family, as well as the remains of people who married into the family, such as Princess Maria Carolina of Savoy, wife of Anthony of Saxony.

The oldest of four crypts, the Founders' Crypt, holds the tombs of King Augustus III of Poland, one of very few Polish Kings to be buried outside the Wawel Cathedral in Kraków, and last Queen of Poland Maria Josepha. It is also burial place of the heart of King Augustus the Strong, whose body was interred in the Wawel Cathedral, and of Polish ruler and first Saxon King Frederick Augustus I of Saxony. Polish princes and princesses are buried in the Founders' Crypt and the Great Crypt.

Outside of Dresden Cathedral in December 2014

== Gallery ==
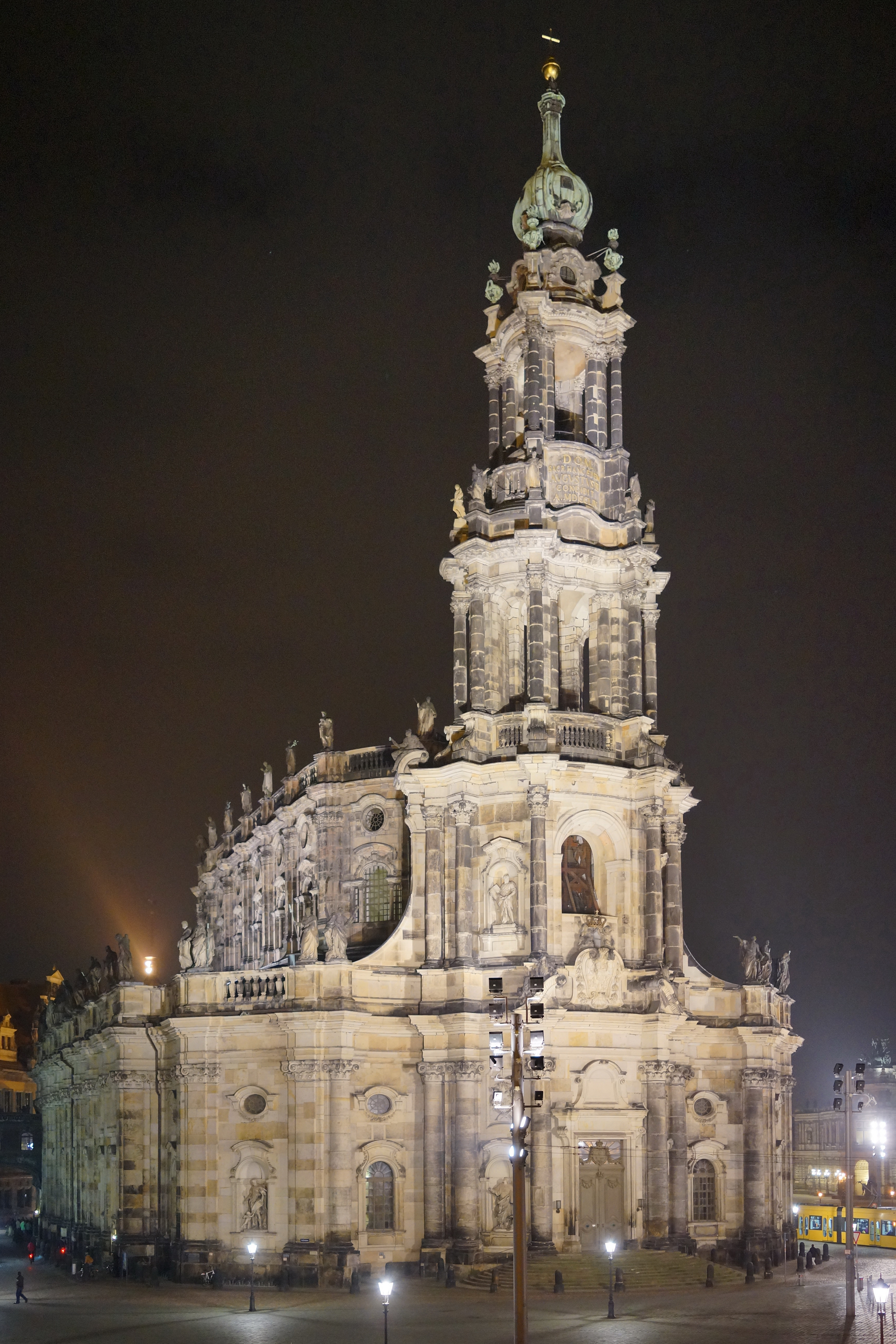
Front from the Elbterrasse

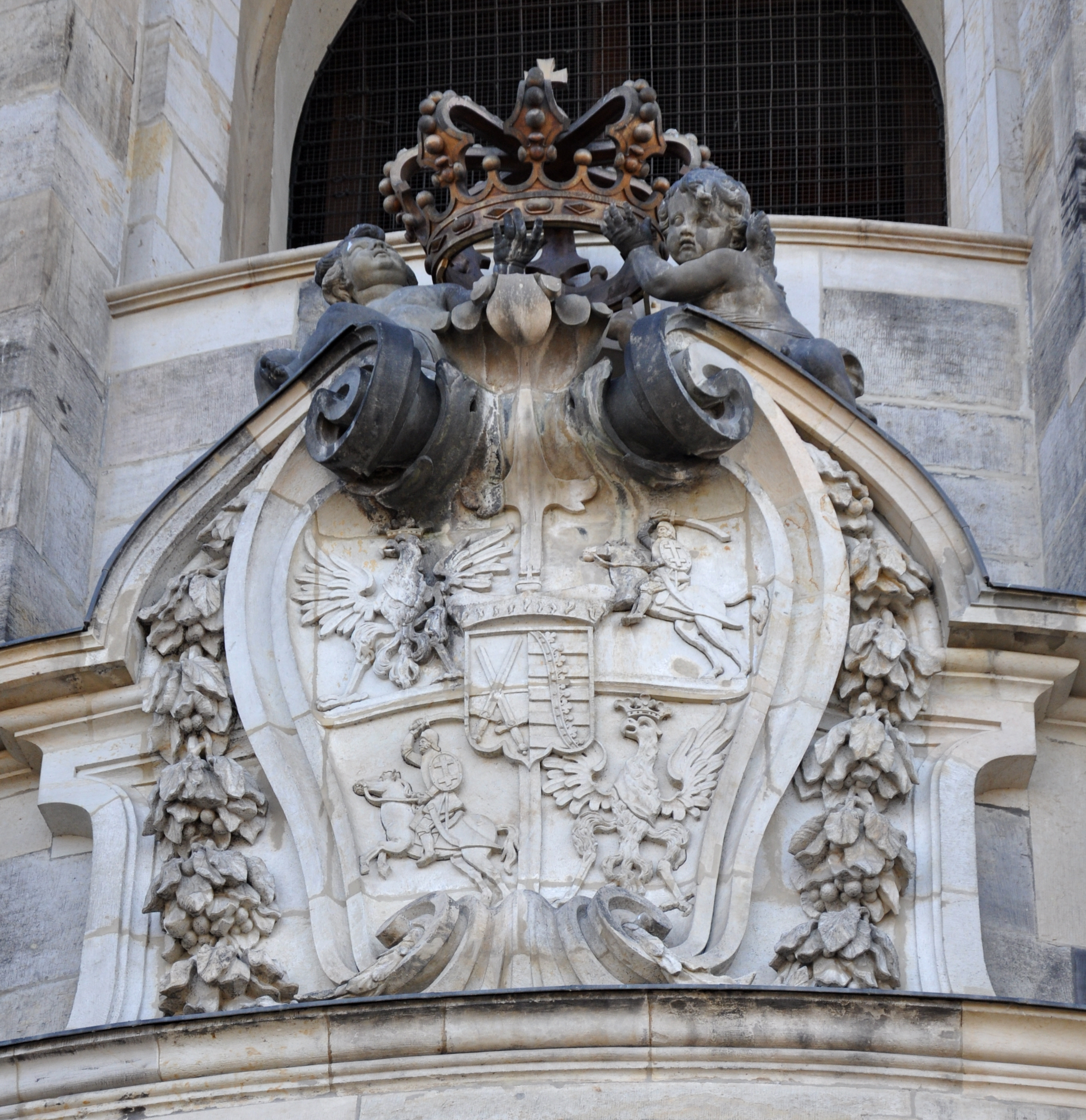
Coat of arms of the Polish–Lithuanian Commonwealth on the facade

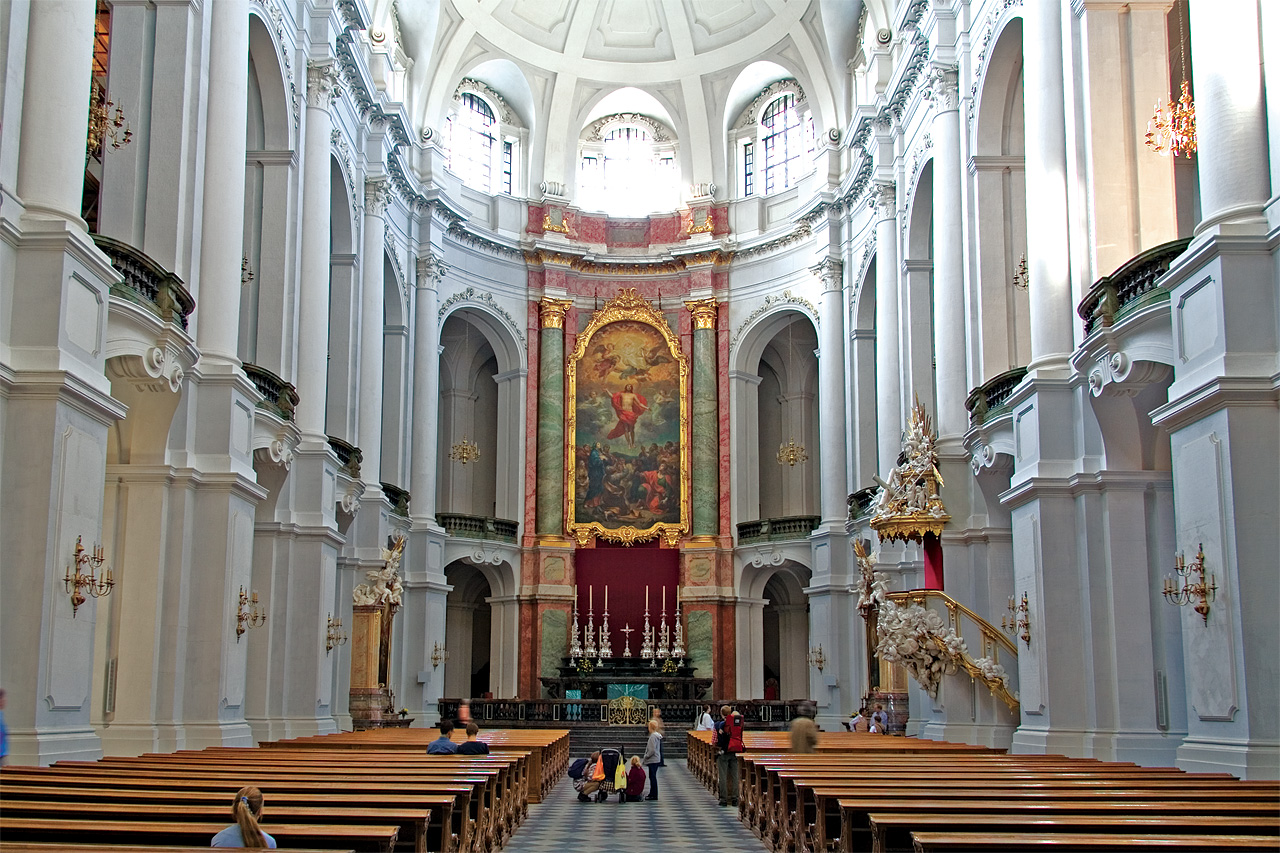
High altar from the nave

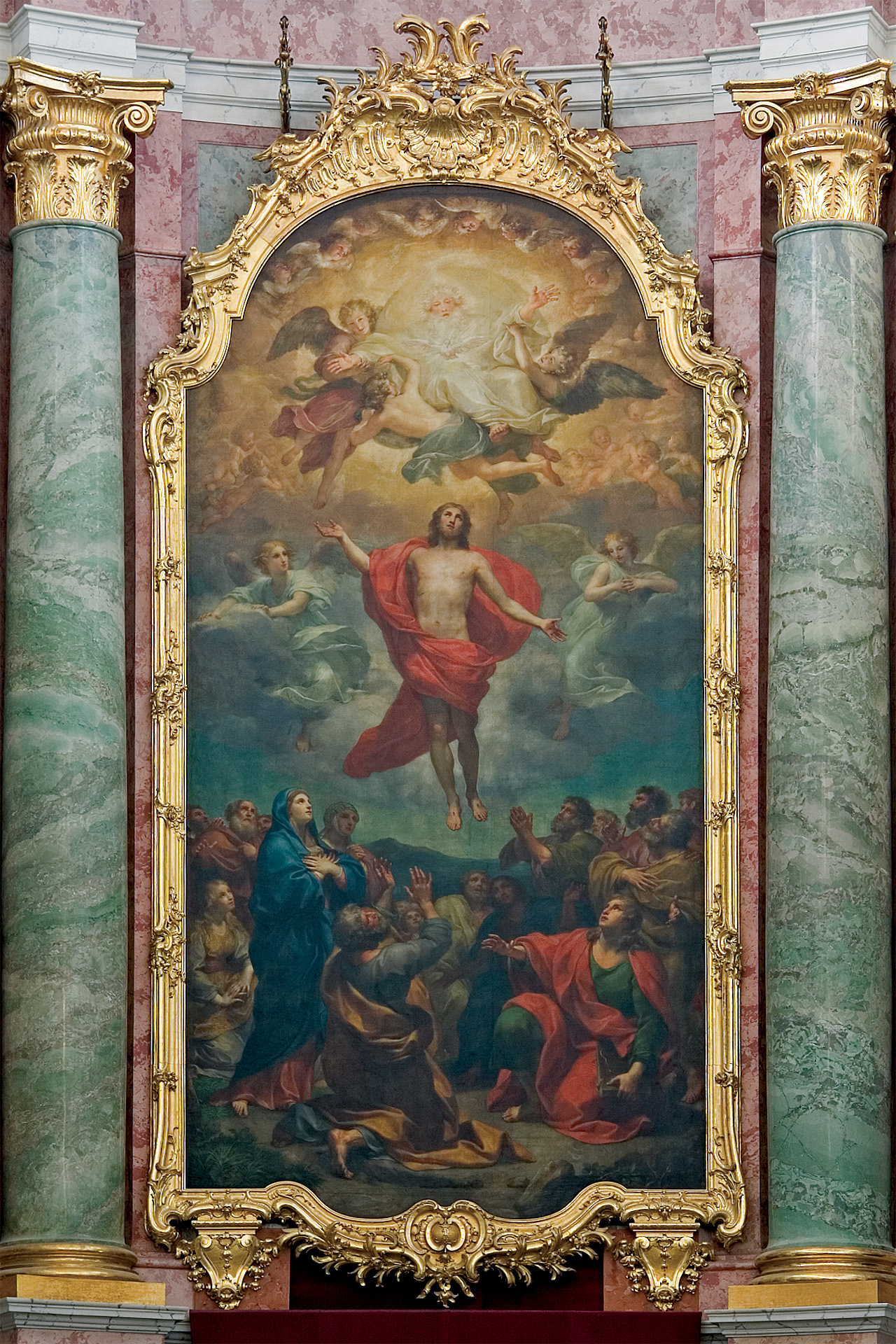
Altar painting

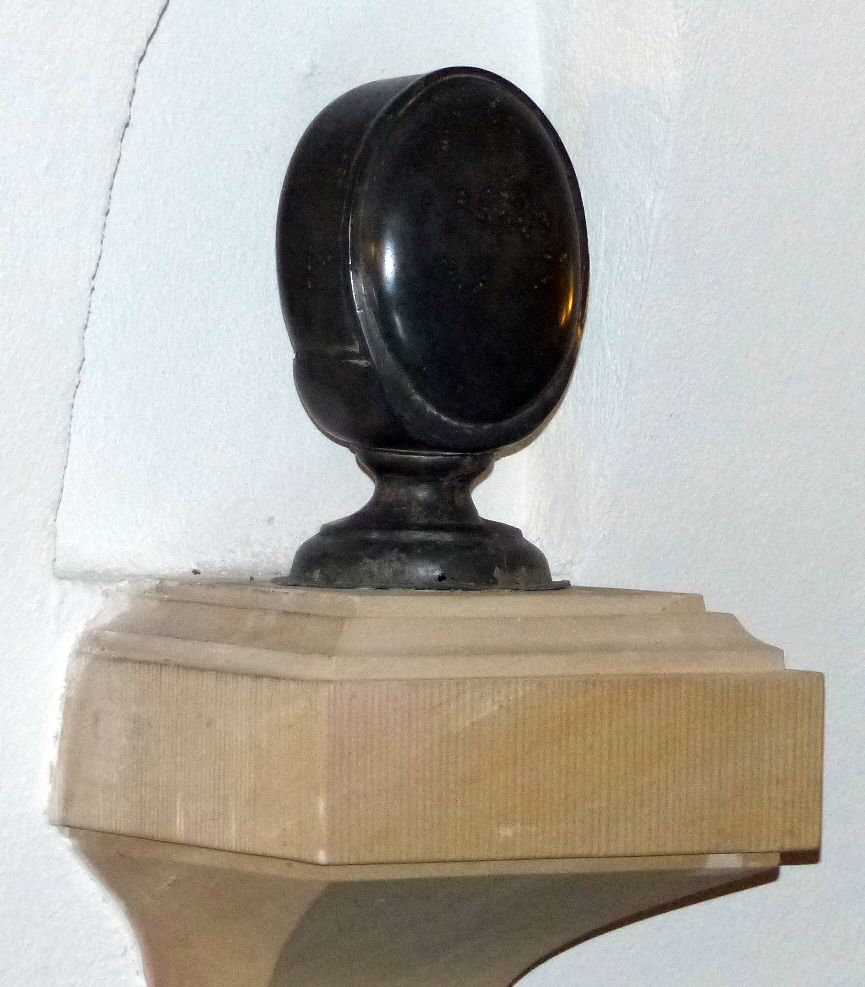
Heart burial of King Augustus II the Strong

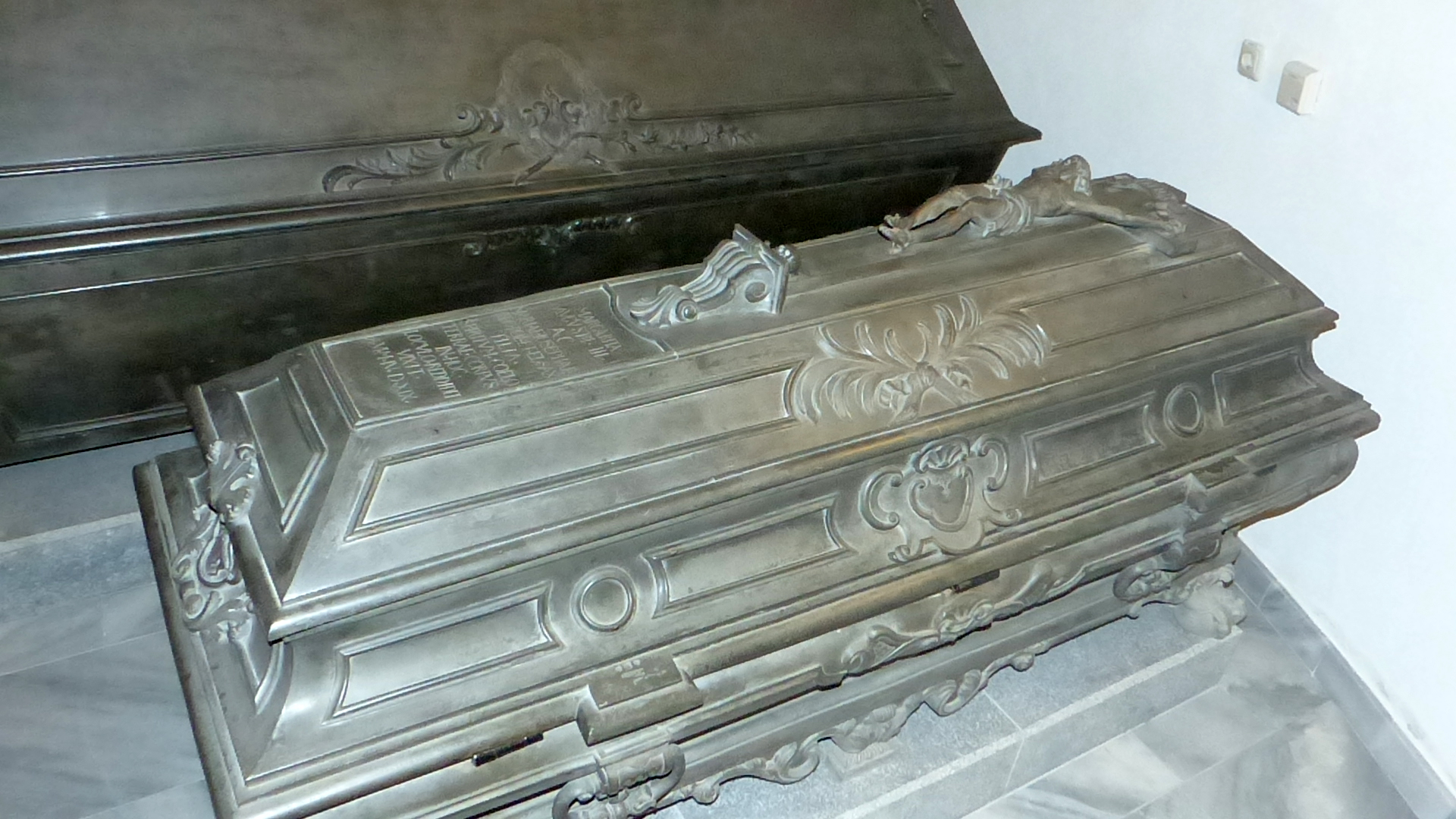
Tomb of Polish princess Maria Margaret

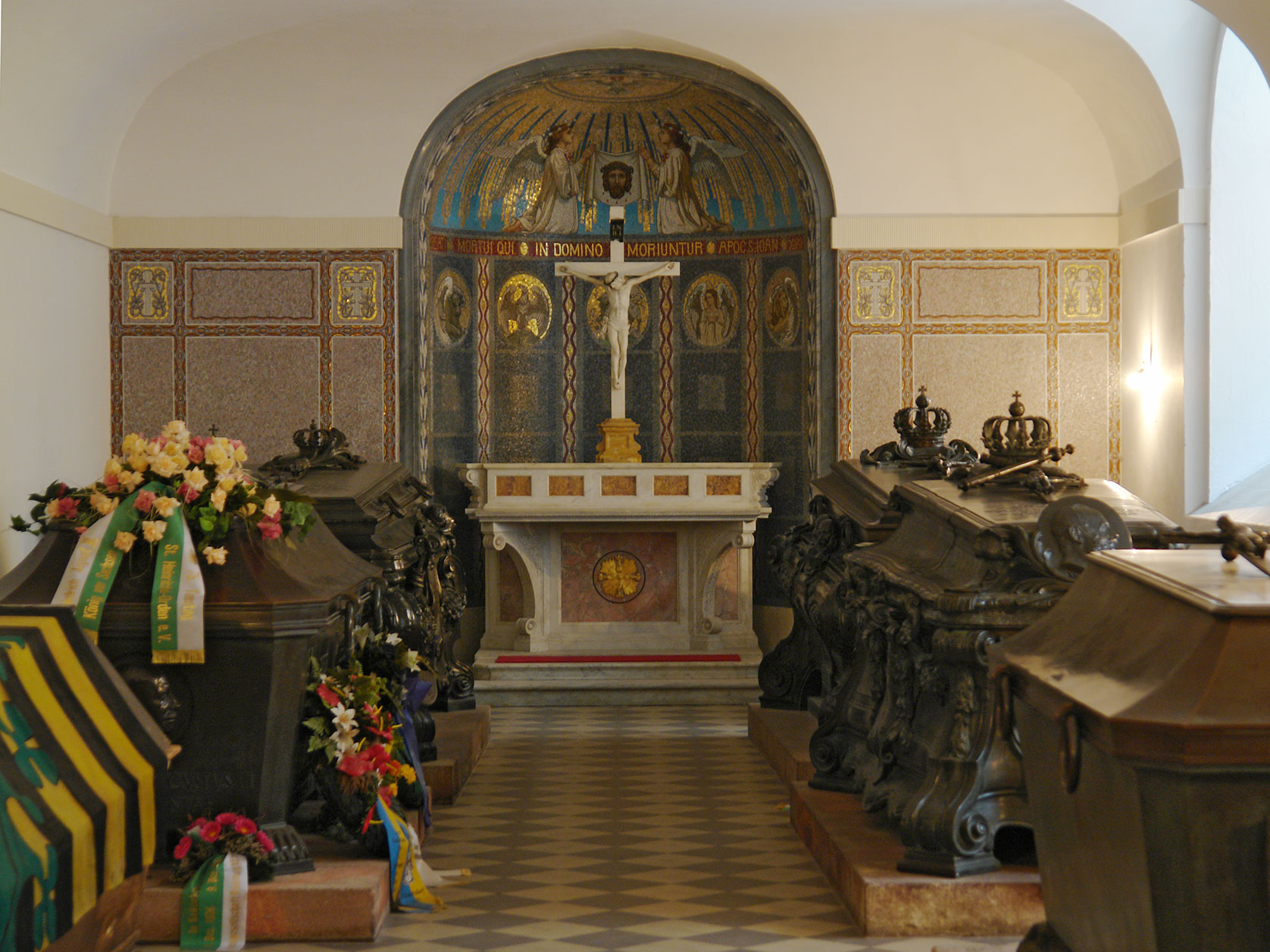
Tombs in the New Crypt

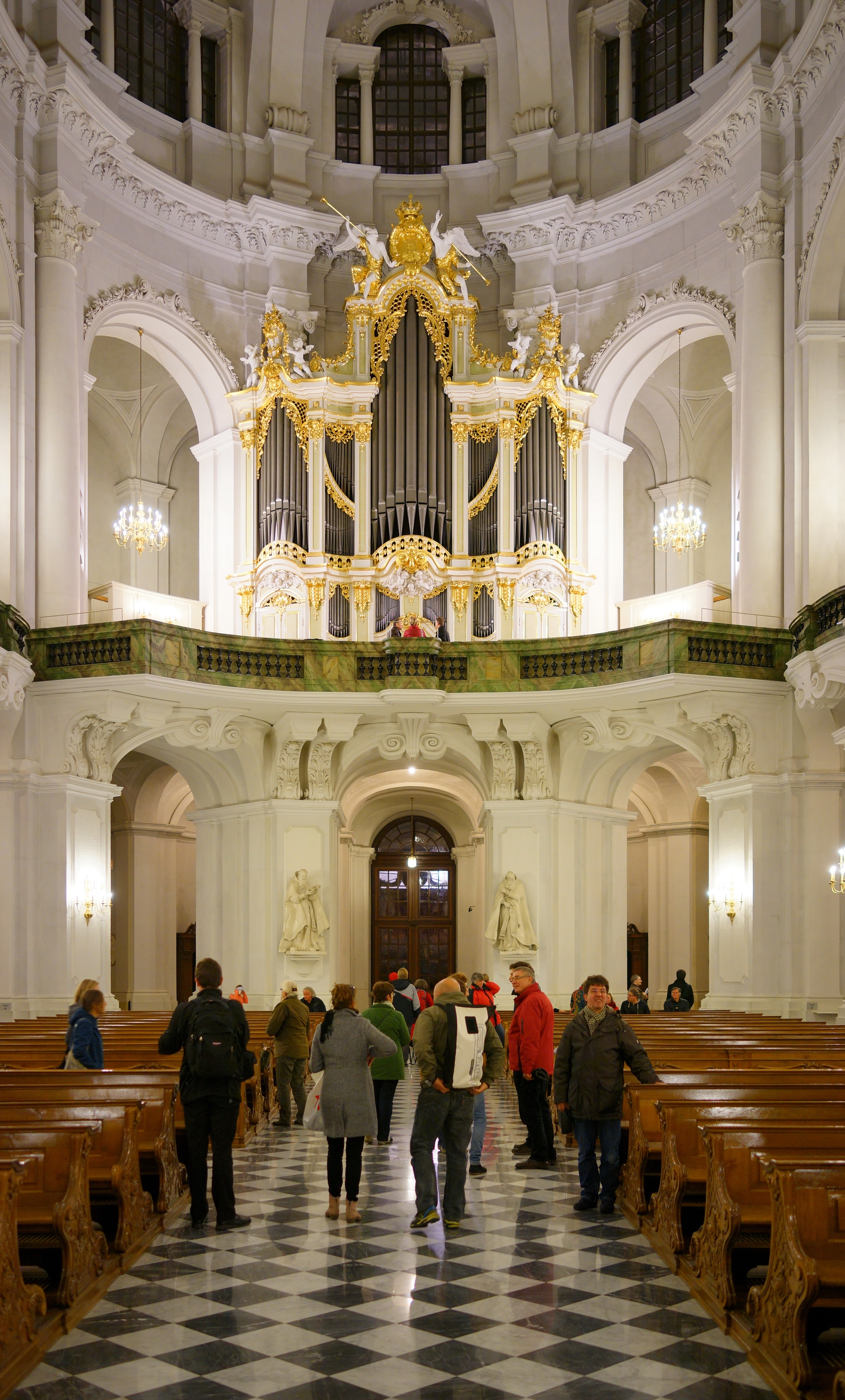
Interior with Silbermann organ

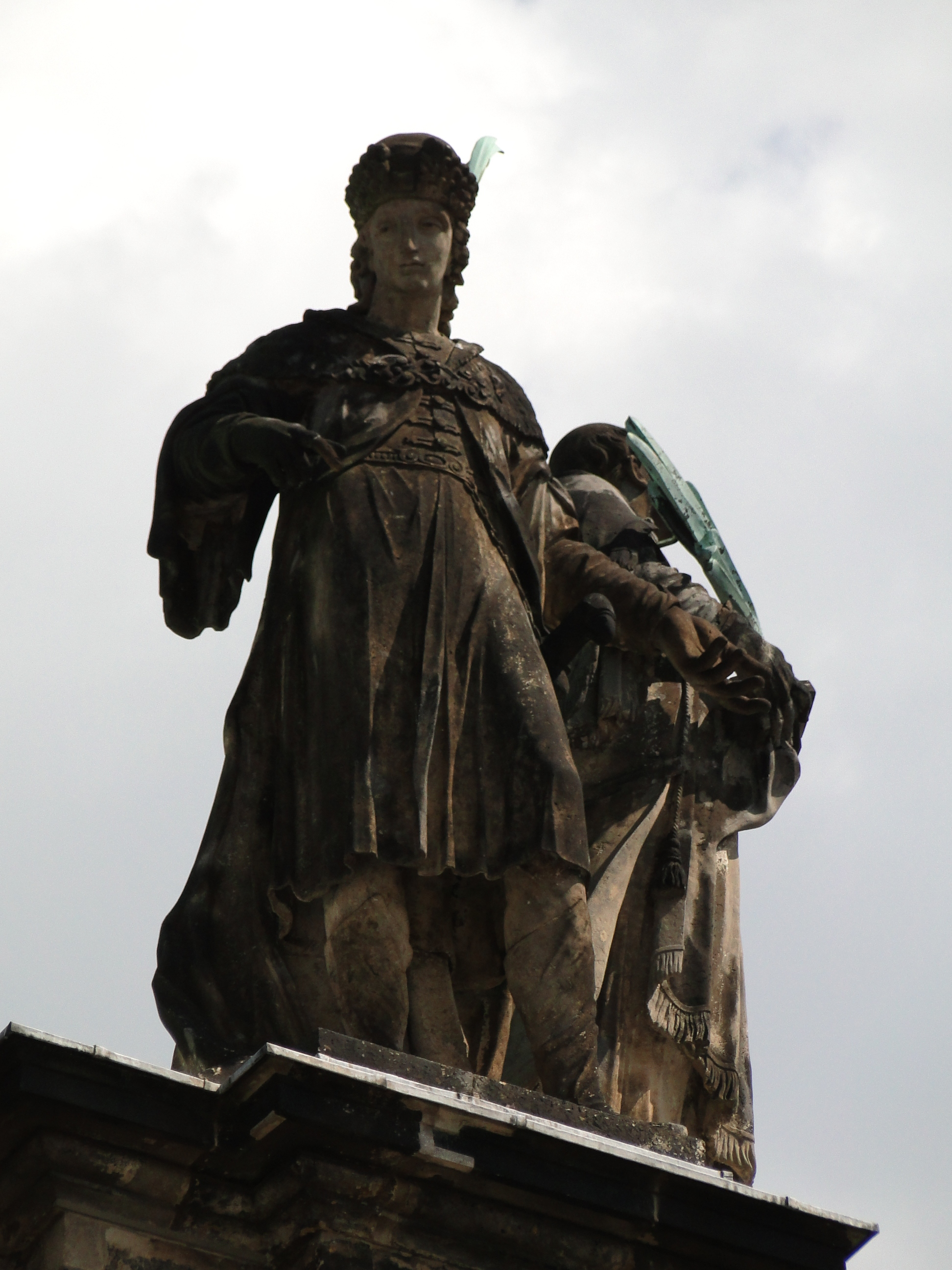
Statue of Saint Casimir

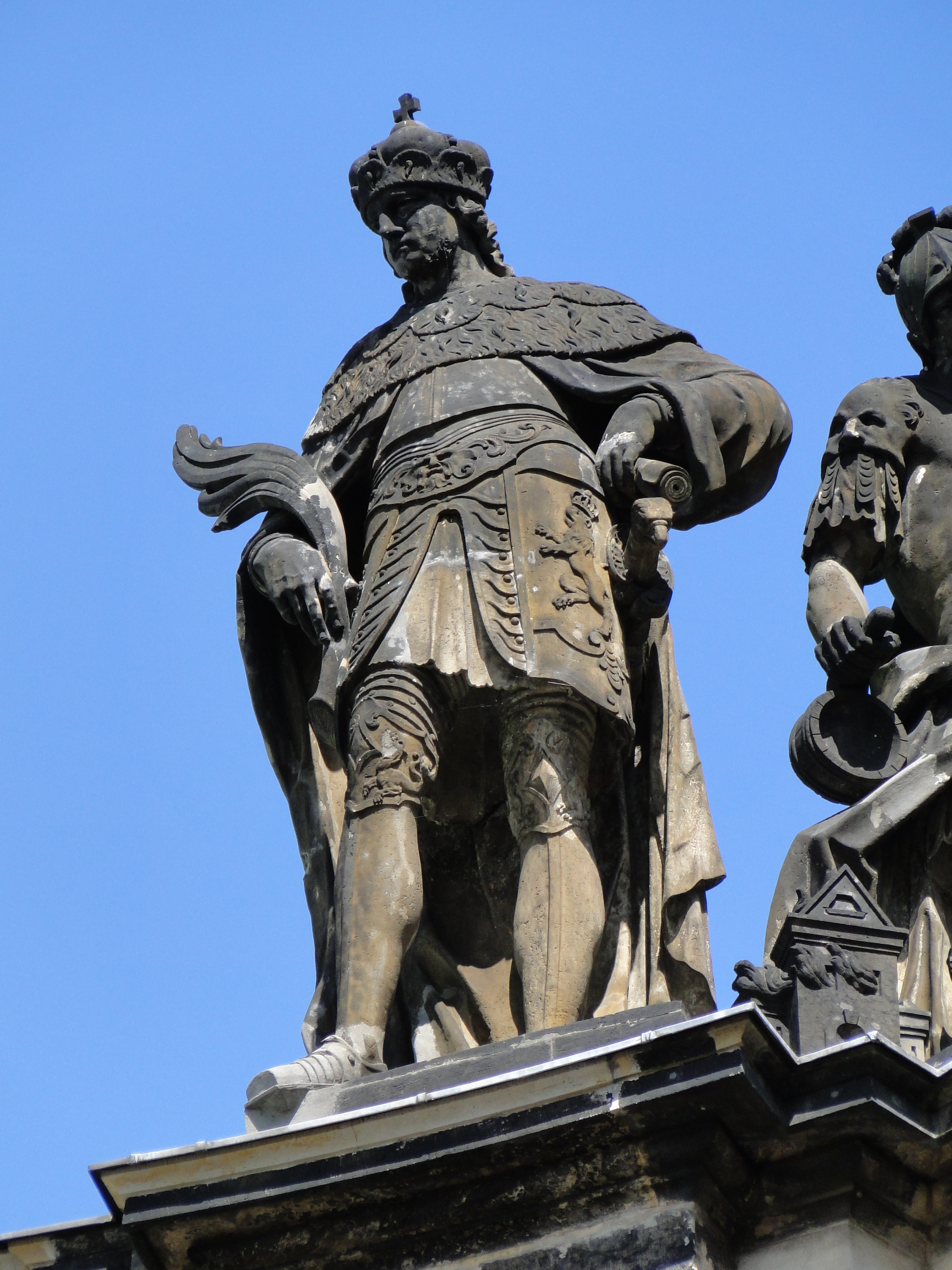
Statue of Wenceslaus I, Duke of Bohemia

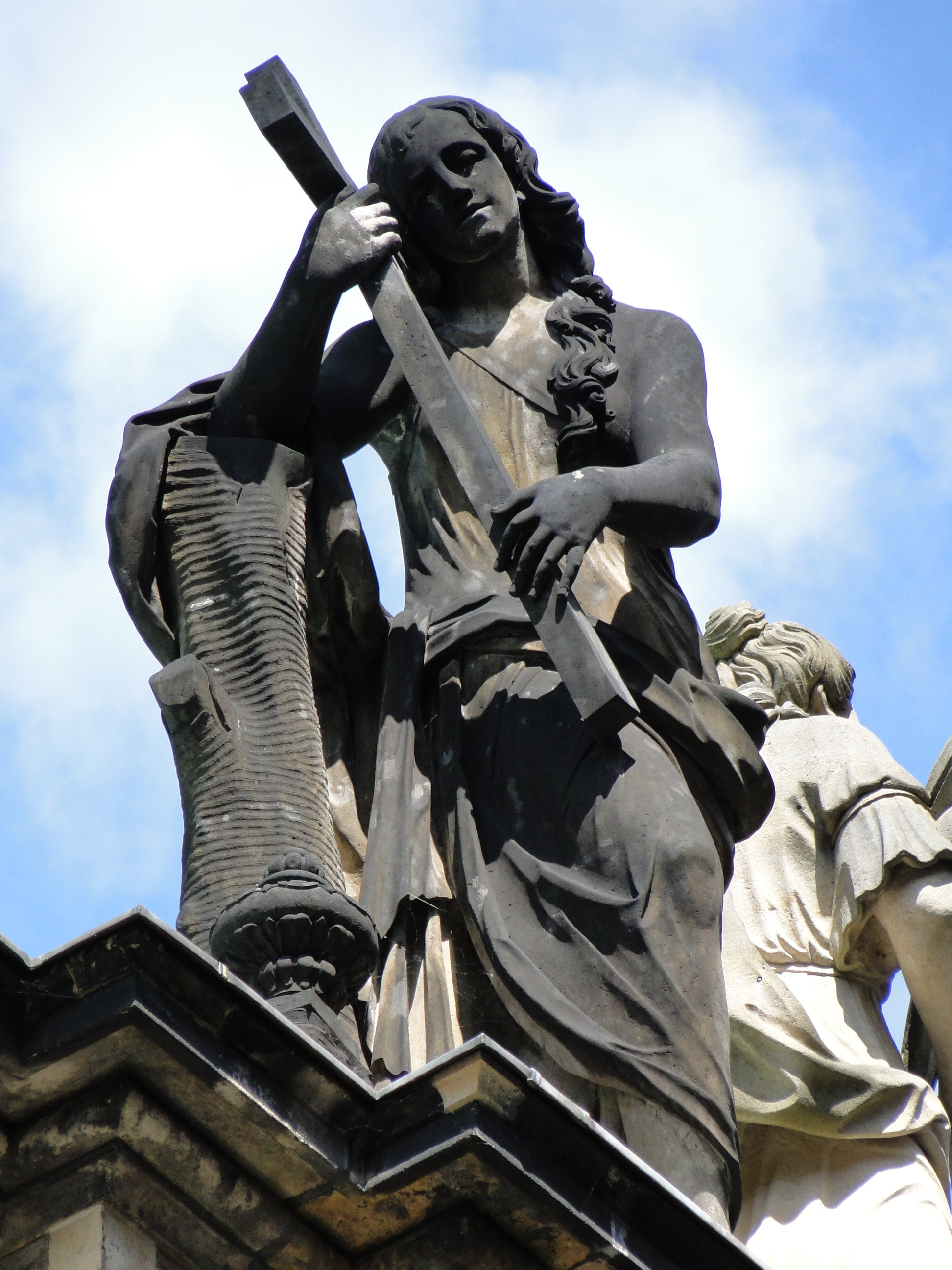
Statue of Mary Magdalene

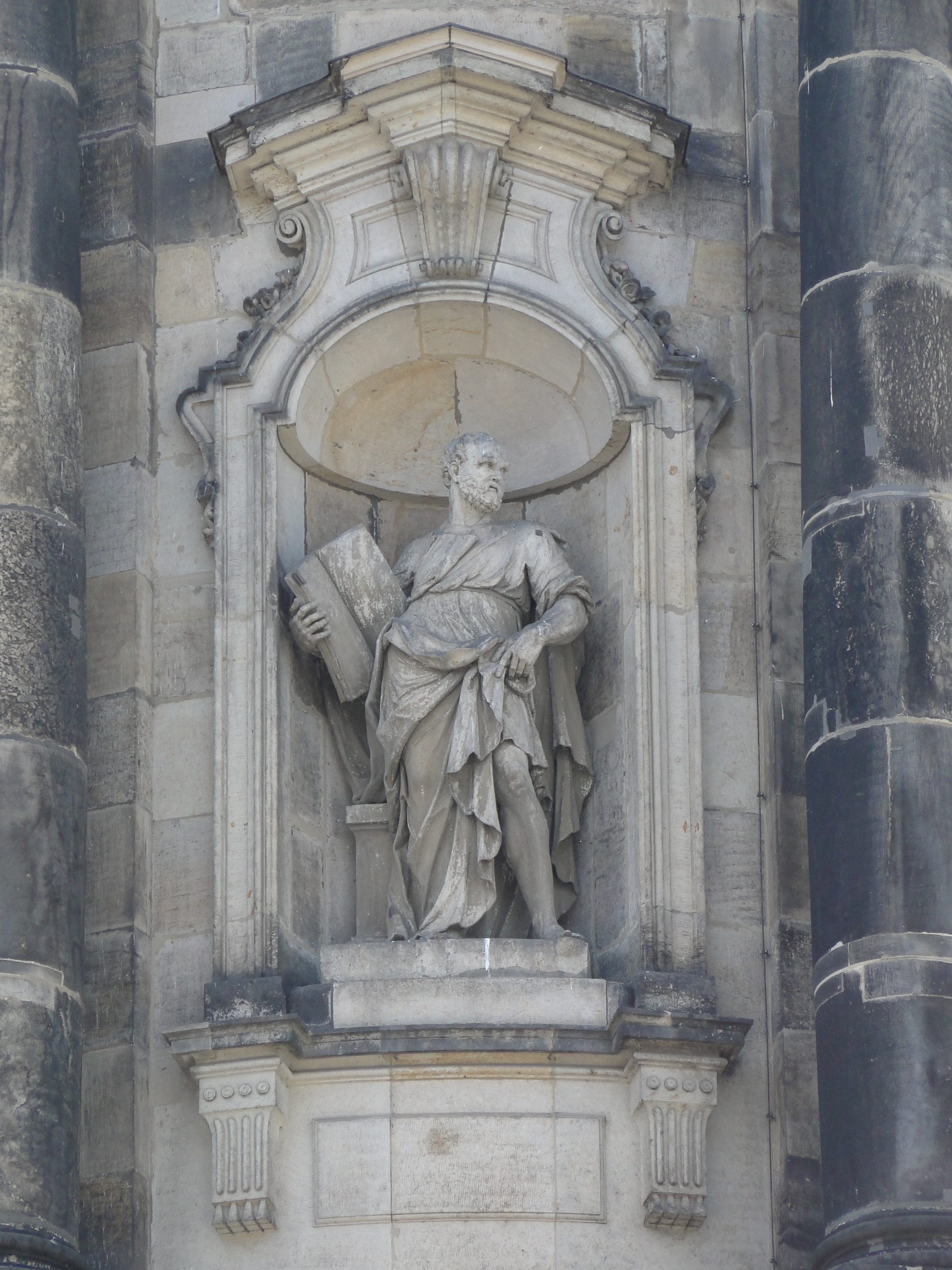
Statue of Saint Peter

== See also ==
- Sophienkirche
