= John of Carlowitz =

John of Carlowitz (Hans von Carlowitz, born 1527; died 24 April 1578) was a German official. In 1575, he was appointed governor of the District of Schwarzenberg and Crottendorf. He held this position until his death in 1578. He was buried in St. Mary's Church, Dohna. He was the instigator of the so-called Saukrieg or "Pig War", the last mediaeval feud in Saxony, He was the son of John Carlowitz the Elder, Lord of Beimendorf and Lindig.

== Literature ==
- Johann Paul Oettel (1748). Alte und neue Historie Der Königl. Pohln. und Churfürstl. Sächß. freyen Berg-Stadt Eybenstock im Meißnischen Ober-Erz-Gebürge, Schneeberg.
