= Eido =

Eido may refer to:

- Eido (moth), a genus of moth in the subfamily Oecophorinae

== People with the name ==
- Eido I (955–1015), bishop of Meissen
- Eido II (d. 1045 or -46), bishop of Meissen
- Walid Eido (1942–2007), a Lebanese politician
- Eido Tai Shimano (1932–2018), a Zen Buddhist master

== See also ==
- Iddo (prophet), a minor Hebrew prophet
