= Dietrich of Meissen =

Dietrich of Meissen refers to:

- Dietrich I of Meissen, Bishop of Meissen (ruled 1024–1040)
- Dietrich von Kittlitz, Bishop of Meissen (ruled 1191–1208)
- Dietrich I, Margrave of Meissen (ruled 1198–1221)
- Dietrich II, Margrave of Meissen (ruled 1291–1307)
