= 1066 =

Calendar year

1066 in various calendars
- Gregorian calendar: 1066; MLXVI
- Ab urbe condita: 1819
- Armenian calendar: 515; ԹՎ ՇԺԵ
- Assyrian calendar: 5816
- Balinese saka calendar: 987–988
- Bengali calendar: 472–473
- Berber calendar: 2016
- English Regnal year: 1 Will. 1
- Buddhist calendar: 1610
- Burmese calendar: 428
- Byzantine calendar: 6574–6575
- Chinese calendar: 乙巳年 (Wood Snake); 3763 or 3556 — to — 丙午年 (Fire Horse); 3764 or 3557
- Coptic calendar: 782–783
- Discordian calendar: 2232
- Ethiopian calendar: 1058–1059
- Hebrew calendar: 4826–4827
- Hindu calendars
- Vikram Samvat: 1122–1123
- Shaka Samvat: 987–988
- Kali Yuga: 4166–4167
- Holocene calendar: 11066
- Igbo calendar: 66–67
- Iranian calendar: 444–445
- Islamic calendar: 458–459
- Japanese calendar: Jiryaku 2 (治暦２年)
- Javanese calendar: 969–971
- Julian calendar: 1066; MLXVI
- Korean calendar: 3399
- Minguo calendar: 846 before ROC 民前846年
- Nanakshahi calendar: −402
- Seleucid era: 1377/1378 AG
- Thai solar calendar: 1608–1609
- Tibetan calendar: ཤིང་མོ་སྦྲུལ་ལོ་ (female Wood-Snake); 1192 or 811 or 39 — to — མེ་ཕོ་རྟ་ལོ་ (male Fire-Horse); 1193 or 812 or 40

1066 (MLXVI) was a common year starting on Sunday of the Julian calendar, the 1066th year of the Common Era (CE) and Anno Domini (AD) designations, the 66th year of the 2nd millennium and the 11th century, and the 7th year of the 1060s decade. As of the start of 1066, the Gregorian calendar was 6 days ahead of the Julian calendar, which was the dominant calendar of the time.

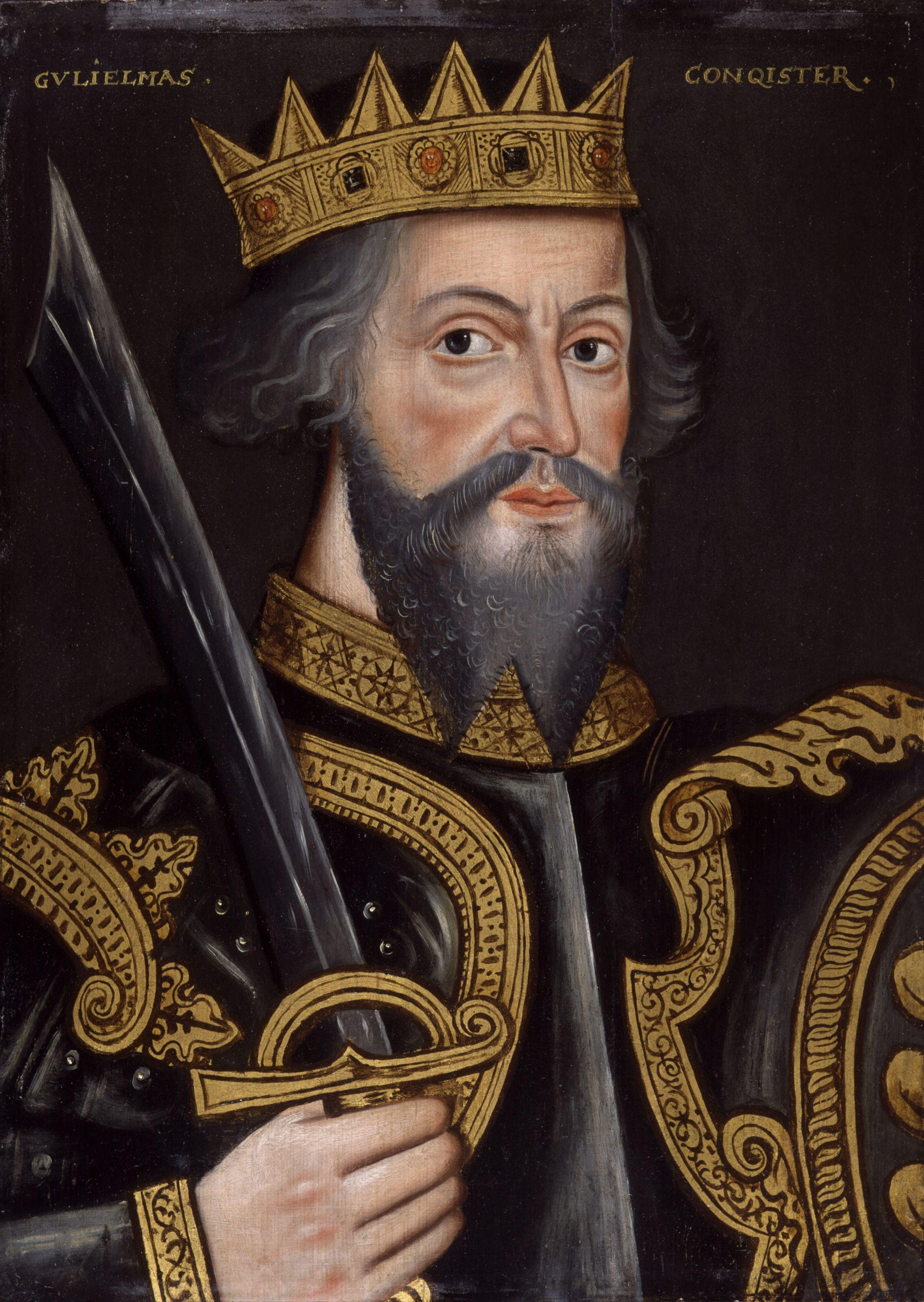
William the Conqueror, King of England 1066–1087

== Events ==
=== Worldwide ===
- March 20 – Halley's Comet reaches perihelion. Its appearance is subsequently recorded in the Bayeux Tapestry.

=== Africa ===
- Egyptian military commander Abu Sa'd Mansur ibn Zunbur known as al-sayyid, al-afḍal appointed Vizier in Egypt.

=== Asia ===
- unknown dates
  - Chinese imperial official Sima Guang presents the emperor with an eight-volume Tongzhi (通志; "Comprehensive Records"), chronicling Chinese history from 403 BCE to the end of the Qin dynasty in 207 BCE. The emperor then issues an edict for the compilation of Guang's universal history of China, allocating funds for the costs of compilation and research assistants such as Liu Ban, Liu Shu and Fan Zuyu.
  - The Abu Hanifa Mosque is established in Baghdad, when the Grand Vizier of the Seljuk Empire, Abu Saad al-Khwarizmi or al-Mustawfi, builds a shrine for Abu Hanifa near his tomb.

=== Europe ===
- June–November – Obodrite revolt
- September 12 – William, Duke of Normandy, assembles a fleet (around 700 warships) at Saint-Valery-sur-Somme, in readiness for an invasion of England.
- December 30 – Granada massacre: A Muslim mob storms the royal palace in Granada, crucifies the Jewish vizier Yusuf ibn Naghrela, and massacres most of the Jewish population.
- Huy becomes the first town in the Low Countries to be granted city rights, by Theodwin of Liège.
- Hedeby (located on the Jutland Peninsula) is sacked and burned by the West Slavs, after which it is slowly abandoned.
- The Republic of Genoa, jealous of the recent successes of its former allies, launches a naval assault on the Republic of Pisa.
- King Stenkil (or Steinkell) dies after a 6-year reign. Two rivals named Eric battle for power in Sweden, both claiming the throne.
- Magnus II (Haraldsson), a son of Harald Hardrada, is crowned king of Norway. He unites Western Norway and Northern Norway.
- Fulk IV, Count of Anjou, known as "the Quarreller", is at war with his brother Geoffrey III, contesting the lands of Anjou and Touraine left to them by their uncle Geoffrey II, Count of Anjou (Martel).
- City of Šibenik first mentioned under its present name in a Charter of the Croatian King Petar Krešimir IV

==== England and Scotland ====
- January – Harold Godwinson marries Ealdgyth, daughter of Ælfgar (earl of Mercia), and widow of King Gruffydd ap Llywelyn.
- January 5 – Edward the Confessor dies after a 24-year reign at London. The Witenagemot (or Witan) proclaims Harold Godwinson king of England.
- January 6 – Harold Godwinson (now known as Harold II) is crowned king of England, probably in the new Westminster Abbey, where Edward the Confessor's funeral took place not long before the coronation.
- September 18 – Harald Hardrada of Norway lands on the beaches of Scarborough, North Yorkshire and begins his invasion of England.
- September 20 – Battle of Fulford: Norwegian forces under Harald Hardrada defeat the English earls Edwin and Morcar.
- September 25 – Battle of Stamford Bridge: Harold II defeats the forces of Harald Hardrada and his own brother Tostig Godwinson.
- September 27 – William, Duke of Normandy and his army set sail from the mouth of the River Somme, beginning the Norman conquest of England. The following day he lands on the English coast at Pevensey, splits his forces, and sails with the main army to Hastings.
- October 6 – Harold II marches south from Stamford Bridge (near York) to counter the threat of the invasion by William. Reaching London within five days, he leaves a short time later. After a two-day march he and his army reach Caldbec Hill.
- October 14 – Battle of Hastings: William and Harold II meet in battle at Hastings. Although Harold has the superior position on the battlefield, he is defeated and killed by William, invading England.
- October 15 – Edgar Ætheling is proclaimed king of England (but is never crowned). He is soon forced to submit to the rule of William the Conqueror.
- December – William the Conqueror moves along the south coast to Dover, and builds fortifications in the existing castle at the top of the cliffs. He moves to Canterbury and finally enters London. Archbishop Stigand and other English leaders submit to William's rule. On December 25, he is crowned as King William I of England in Westminster Abbey over Edward the Confessor's grave.
- unknown date – Tain becomes the first town in Scotland to be chartered as a royal burgh by King Malcolm III (Canmore).

== Births ==
- February 22 – Lý Nhân Tông, Vietnamese emperor (d. 1128)
- Al-Afdal Shahanshah, vizier of the Fatimid Caliphate (d. 1121)
- Gilbert Fitz Richard, English nobleman (approximate date)
- Godfrey of Amiens, French abbot and bishop (d. 1115)
- Henry, count of Portugal (House of Burgundy) (d. 1112)
- Irene Doukaina (or Ducaena), Byzantine empress (d. 1138)
- Wang Cha-ji, Korean politician and general (d. 1122)

== Deaths ==
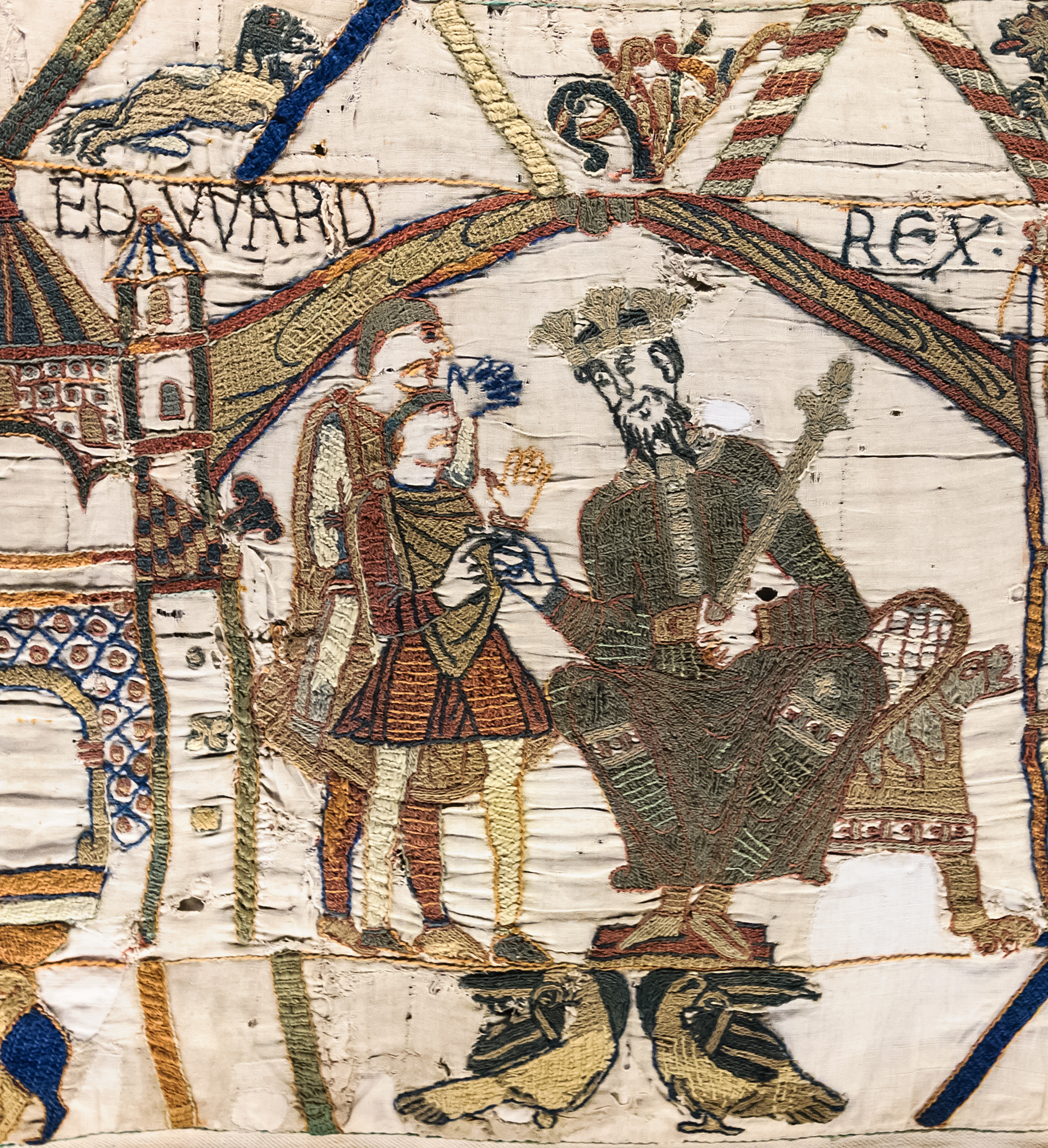
Edward the Confessor as he appears in the Bayeux Tapestry.

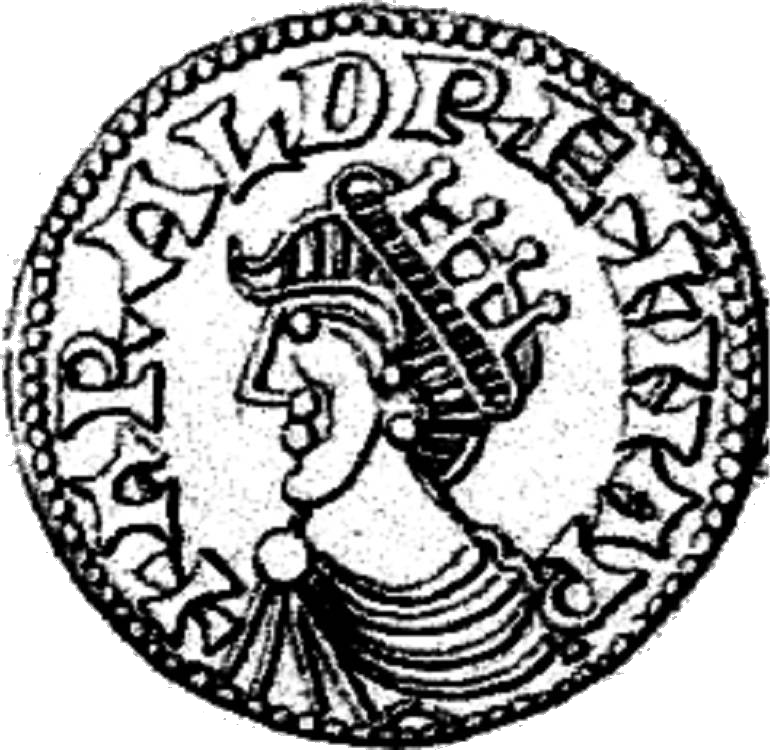
A coin depicting Harold III.

- January 5 – Edward the Confessor, king of England
- February 3 – Rostislav of Tmutarakan, Kievan Rus' prince (b. 1038)
- February 12 – Everard I of Breteuil, French nobleman
- March 26 – Ibn Sidah, Moorish linguist and lexicographer (b. 1007)
- April 9 – Al-Bayhaqi, Persian Sunni hadith scholar (b. 994)
- May 21 – Su Xun, Chinese scholar and writer (b. 1009)
- June 6 – Gottschalk (or Godescalc), Obotrite prince
- June 27 – Arialdo, Italian nobleman and deacon
- August 15 – Al-Qadi Abu Ya'la, Arab Hanbali scholar (b. 990)
- September 25 (killed at the Battle of Stamford Bridge):
  - Eystein Orre, Norwegian nobleman
  - Harald III (Harald Hardrada), king of Norway
  - Tostig Godwinson, earl of Northumbria
- September 25 – Maria Haraldsdotter, Norwegian princess
- October 14 (killed at the Battle of Hastings):
  - Harold II (Harold Godwinson), king of England
  - Leofwine Godwinson, brother of Harold II
  - Gyrth Godwinson, brother of Harold II
  - Taillefer, Norman minstrel
- November 10 – John Scotus, bishop of Mecklenburg
  - Sacrificed to Radegast, the god of hospitality.
- November 14 – Fujiwara no Akihira, Japanese nobleman
- December 11 – Conan II, duke of Brittany
- December 30 – Yusuf ibn Naghrela, Jewish vizier
- Abu al-Hakam al-Kirmani, Moorish philosopher
- Ali al-Sulayhi, sultan of Yemen and Tihamah (b. 966)
- Conrad of Pfullingen, archbishop of Trier
- Herluin de Conteville, Norman nobleman (b. 1001)
- Kraft of Meissen (or Crafto), German bishop
- Reiner of Meissen (or Rainer), German bishop
- Śrīpati, Indian astronomer and mathematician (b. 1019)
- Theobald of Provins, French hermit (b. 1033)
- Udayadityavarman II, Cambodian ruler
- Yahya of Antioch, Byzantine historian
