= Hugbert of Meissen =

Bishop of Meissen

for Hugbert, Duke of Bavaria, see Hugbert of Bavaria

Hugbert of Meissen (also noted as Hubert, Hukbrecht, Hucbert, Humbert, Umbert, Huprecht, Humprecht, Wipert, Wiprecht, and Rupert; died on or about 27 March 1024 or on 5 April 1024) was Bishop of Meissen from 1023 to 1024.

There is no information on his previous life or career. He was consecrated by Humfrid, Archbishop of Magdeburg. He was buried in Meissen Cathedral, but the exact position of his burial is now unknown.

Preceded by Eilward	Bishop of Meissen; 1016–1023	Succeeded by Dietrich I of Meissen
