= Bodenstein =

Bodenstein is a German surname. Notable people with the surname include:

- Adam von Bodenstein (1528–1577), Swiss Paracelsian alchemist and physician
- Andreas Rudolf Bodenstein von Karlstadt (1486–1541), early Protestant reformer
- Christel Bodenstein (1938–2024), German actress
- Corne Bodenstein (born 1992), South African-born cricketer for Jersey
- Cornelis Johannes Bodenstein (1826–1885), Boer politician and Vice State President of the South African Republic
- Dietrich H. Bodenstein (1908–1984), German-American entomologist
- Max Bodenstein (1871–1942), German chemist
- Ruth Bodenstein-Hoyme
