= Withego von Furra =

Bishop of Meissen

Withego von Furra or de Wuor (also Witigo, Witticho), otherwise Withego I of Meissen or Withego I von Furra (died 6 March 1293) was Bishop of Meissen from 1266 to his death.

== Name and origin ==
Withego belonged to a family of Thuringian ministeriales who took their name from Burg Furra (or Wuor) located between Nordhausen and Sondershausen. Until the mid-19th century it was presumed that, like his successor Bernhard von Kamenz, he was a member of the Von Kamenz family, since they frequently used the name Withego: this was subsequently shown to be incorrect by, among others, Hermann Knothe.

A Canon Withego is mentioned in 1250 for the first time in the Marienstift, the religious community at Erfurt Cathedral. On 26 September 1274 Withego endowed two vicariates in the cathedral, where he was presumably educated as a domicellar before becoming a canon of the Stift.

In 1255 Withego was appointed cantor et prepositus at the collegiate church of Nordhausen, the Nordhäuser Dom. In 1263 he entered, as protonotary, the service of Margrave Henry III, Margrave of Meissen, to whom he possibly owed his elevation as bishop in 1266.

== Withego as bishop ==
At his election as bishop he left the service of the margrave. During almost three decades in his episcopal office he was successful in securing and extending the bishopric's possessions in the face of the Margraves of Meissen and the Ascanian Margraves of Upper Lusatia as well as lesser lords, using among other means judicially placed interdicts and excommunications to put pressure on secular rulers.

He promoted the veneration of Saint Benno of Meissen.

In 1274 Withego took part in the Second Council of Lyon, by which he was excommunicated between 1277 and 1281, since he refused to pay the tithe the Council decided to levy for a new crusade.

== Monument ==
His gravestone, a worn-down sandstone tablet with a legible Latin inscription, still exists. As is shown by an illustration of the burial places in Meissen Cathedral of 1593, his grave was once in front of the Heiligkreuz altar. In 1919 the gravestone, with a carved image of a bishop and an inscription, was discovered in the north aisle of the cathedral.

| Preceded by Albrecht von Mutzschen | Bishop of Meissen; 1266–1293 | Succeeded by Bernard von Kamenz |
