= Bruno I =

Bruno I or Brun I may refer to:

- Bruno the Great, archbishop of Cologne as Bruno I (r. 953–965)
- Bruno I (bishop of Verden) (died 976)
- Brun I of Brunswick (died c. 1010), count
- Bruno I of Meissen, bishop (r. 1046–1065)
- Bruno I of Isenburg-Braunsberg (fl. 1179–1210)
