= AICO =

AICO may refer to:

- A.I.C.O. -Incarnation-, a Japanese science fiction original net animation (ONA) anime series
- American Innovation and Choice Online Act, proposed antitrust legislation in the US Congress
- ASEAN Industrial Cooperation Scheme, an industrial initiative established by the Association of Southeast Asian Nations; see Automotive industry in Thailand
- Indigenous Authorities of Colombia (Spanish: Autoridades Indígenas de Colombia, or AICO), a Colombian political party of indigenous people
- Eido II (also noted as "Aico"), bishop of Meissen from 1040 to 1045 or 1046
