= Godebold of Meissen =

Bishop of Meissen

Godebold of Meissen (also noted as Godebald, Godewald, Gottwald, Goswald, Gotthold, Gotthard, Gerhold and Gorhold; died 31 August 1140), was Bishop of Meissen from 1119 to 1140.

== Life ==
Godebold, of whose earlier life nothing is known, was enthroned by the then Archbishop of Magdeburg, Rudgar of Veltheim, and was on friendly terms with Rudgar's successor, Saint Norbert of Xanten, supporting him loyally during an uprising and through his persecution in Magdeburg.

At a diocesan synod in 1130 hosted by Godebold, the Margrave Conrad I of Meissen was present with his sons Otto (later Otto II of Meissen), Dietrich (later Margrave of Lusatia), Henry (later Henry I of Wettin), Dedi (later Dedi III of Lusatia), and Frederick (later Frederick I of Brehna).

In 1130 Godebold rebuilt the old Meissen Cathedral, which was the converted castle chapel, as a Romanesque basilica with four towers (entirely replaced by the present Gothic cathedral 100 years later). During his episcopate several monasteries were founded.

Older lists of bishops include a Bishop Berthold between Herwig and Godebold, but there is no documentary evidence to support this. Machatschek therefore follows Gersdorf in regarding Godebold as the immediate successor of Herwig.

In addition, other old lists include a Bishop Grambert between Herwig and Godebold, but this is a chronological and transcription error for Godebold's successor, Bishop Reinward.

| Preceded by Herwig of Meissen | Bishop of Meissen; 1119–1140 | Succeeded by Reinward |
