= Heinrich von Abendroth =

Saxon lieutenant general and military writer

Heinrich von Abendroth (May 17, 1819 - February 18, 1880) was a Saxon lieutenant general and military writer.

== Life ==
Heinrich von Abendorth comes from the noble family Abendroth. He was born to Christian Friedrich von Abendroth (1779–1842) and Marianne von Segnitz (1786–1826) in Wurzen.

In 1831, at the age of 12, he became a Cadet in the Kaddetenhaus in Dresden with Karl Eduard Pönitz as mentor. 1836 he leaves the Kadettenhaus and became a Portpeejunker at the 2nd Company of the 3. königlich-sächsischen Schützenbataillons in Wurzen.
