= Volkold =

Bishop of Meissen

Volkold of Meissen (also Wolcold, Folcold, Folchold, Volhold, Volkhuld, Volchrad, Vocco; died 23 August 992) was the second Bishop of Meissen.

== Life ==
Before his elevation to the episcopate all that is known of Volkold's life is that he was at the court of Emperor Otto I as one of the tutors of the Emperor's son, the future Otto II. He seems to have been appointed Bishop of Meissen in 969. Before his elevation Volkold was the patron of the young Willigis, later Saint Willigis, and used his influence to obtain for him a position in the Imperial service. In 972 Volkold attended a synod in Ingelheim.

When Boleslaus II, Duke of Bohemia, besieged the Albrechtsburg and the town of Meissen in 984 in support of the Imperial ambitions of Henry II of Bavaria after the death of Otto II, Volkold was obliged to seek refuge from the Sorbs in Erfurt, under the protection of Willigis, and was not able to return to his badly damaged headquarters until after the re-conquest by Ekkehard I, Margrave of Meissen, in 987. In that year he put the diocese under Imperial protection.

Doubtless as compensation for the bishopric's many losses he received from Otto II several gifts of estates, tolls and uses.

While on a visit to Prague he suffered a stroke, on Good Friday 992, and returned paralysed to Meissen, where he died on 23 August and was buried.

== Sources ==
- Karl Uhlirz (1896). "Volkold". Allgemeine Deutsche Biographie (in German). Vol. 40. Leipzig: Duncker & Humblot. pp. 245–246.
- Machatschek, Eduard: Geschichte der Bischöfe des Hochstiftes Meissen in chronologischer Reihenfolge: Zugleich en Beitrag zur Culturgeschichte der Mark Meissen und des Herzog und Kurfürstenthums Sachsens. Nach dem "Codex diplomaticus Saxoniae regiae", anderen glaubwürdigen Quellen und bewährten Geschichtswerken bearbeitet. C.C. Meinhold, Dresden 1884. pp.19-23
- Ernst Gotthelf Gersdorf: Urkundenbuch des Hochstifts Meissen. Bd 1, p. XVI

| Preceded by Burchard of Meissen | Bishop of Meissen; 969–992 | Succeeded by Eido I |
