= Albrecht von Mutzschen =

Bishop of Meissen

Albrecht von Mutzschen otherwise Albrecht II of Meissen or Albrecht II von Mutzschen (died 24 July 1266) was Bishop of Meissen from 1258 to 1266.

Albrecht was a member of the noble von Mutzschen family (later also von Motzin). He was a canon of Meissen Cathedral and provost of the collegiate church of Wurzen. His episcopate, about which there is little information, coincided with the Interregnum and the War of the Thuringian Succession.

Albrecht died in Löbnitz. He was buried on 1 August 1266 in Meissen Cathedral. Fragments of his sarcophagus survive. It was discovered in the 18th century. Despite gaps in the inscriptions it was possible to date it. On the lid a scratched drawing of a mitre and crosier is distinguishable.

== Sources ==
- Eduard Machatschek: Geschichte der Bischöfe des Hochstiftes Meissen in chronologischer Reihenfolge (...), pp. 190–199. Dresden 1884

Preceded by Konrad von Wallhausen	Bishop of Meissen; 1258–1266	Succeeded by Withego von Furra
