= Rehfeldt =

Rehfeldt is a surname of German origin. Notable people with the surname include:

- Don Rehfeldt (1927–1980), American basketball player
- Mathias Rehfeldt (born 1986), German composer, music producer and organist
- Robert Rehfeldt (1931–1993), German graphic artist
- Torben Rehfeldt (born 1993), German footballer
