= Ruth Wolf-Rehfeldt =

German artist (1932–2024)

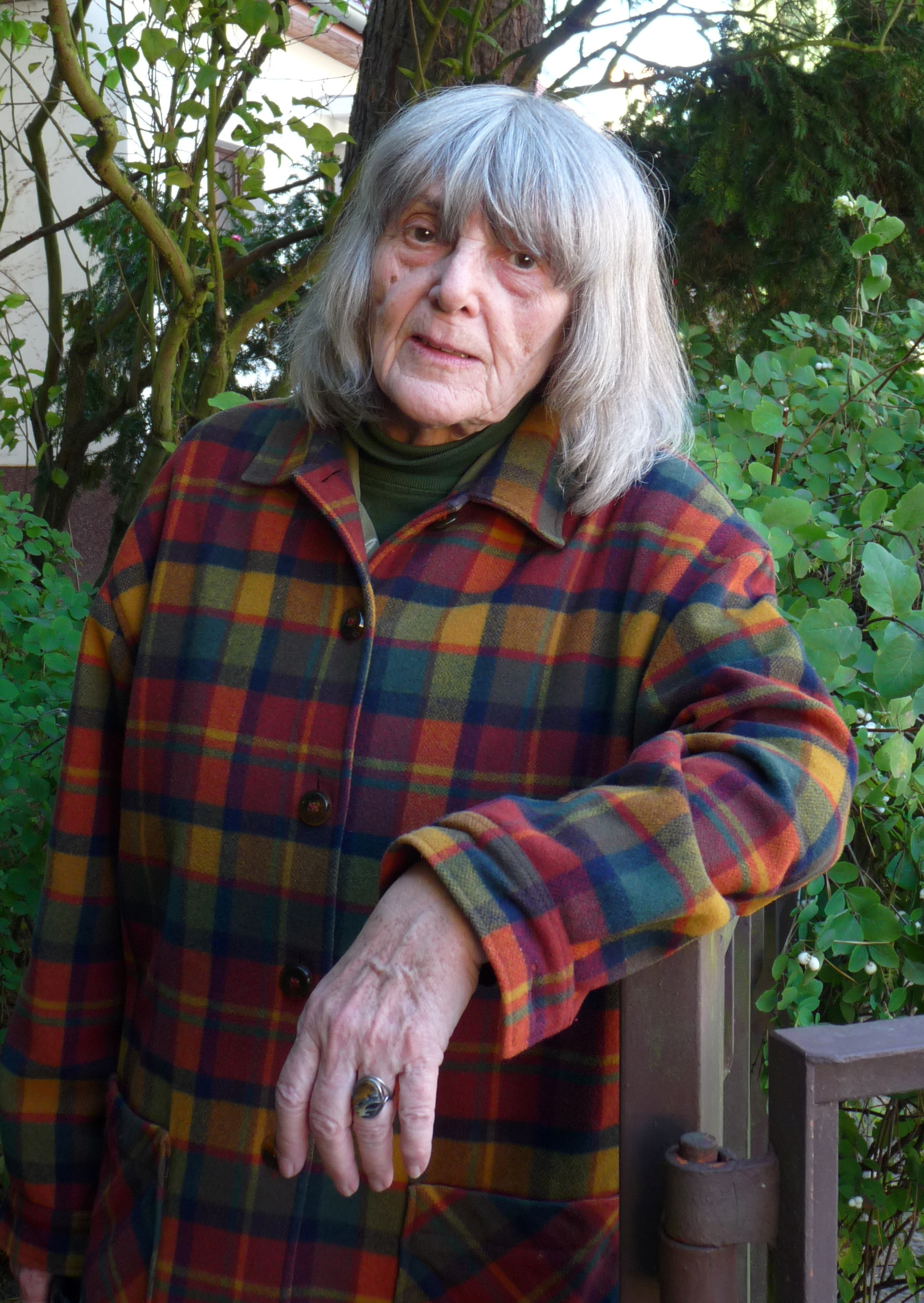
- Wolf-Rehfeldt in 2012
- Born: Ruth Wolf; 8 February 1932; Wurzen, Saxony, Germany
- Died: 26 February 2024 (aged 92); Berlin, Germany
- Movement: Visual Poetry, Mail Art

Ruth Wolf-Rehfeldt (8 February 1932 – 26 February 2024) was a German artist associated with visual poetry and mail art. In 1955 she married fellow artist Robert Rehfeldt in Berlin. A collection of her work was part of the 2017 documenta 14 art exhibition.

== Biography ==
Wolf-Rehfeldt was employed as an office manager, and working as a self-taught artist under a regime of strict surveillance in the former German Democratic Republic. She turned herself into a typist—a stereotypical female job—to enable control over the content of her pages. She practiced camouflage: aptly “sterilized” and imbued with mechanic anonymity, her signs resisted alienation to broadcast free messages and to communicate openly.

Wolf-Rehfeldt died in Berlin on 26 February 2024, at the age of 92.

== Works ==
Wolf-Rehfeldt is known particularly for a period of geometric and poetic typewriter graphics art that she called "typewritings" produced between the 1970s and 1990, mostly as part of Mail Art collaborations. Her work is interested in environmental issues and human rights.

Mail art allowed Wolf-Rehfeldt to communicate and form networks with artists living under totalitarian regimes similar to hers during a time of international isolation. These works traveled the globe, sent as postcards from Ruth Wolf-Rehfeldt in the GDR capital of Berlin to Western Europe, the Eastern Bloc, North America, Latin America, Asia, New Caledonia. No rules and no restrictions, besides formats and postage fees to ensure circulation: by distributing free artworks to a community of participants along rhizomatic routes, mail art eluded the diktats of censorship and market alike, even as they engaged with conditions of official surveillance. Kunstpostbriefe (art letters) operated as free spaces of exhibition, exchange, and personal correspondence.
