= Herwig of Meissen =

Bishop of Meissen

Herwig of Meissen (also noted as Herwich, Hervicus, Herevig, Herevicus, Hertwig, Herdewig or Hebicus; died 27 June 1119) was Bishop of Meissen from 1106 to 1119.

Based on his later attachment to the place, Herwig is believed to have originated from Wurzen in the Gau Siusili. He founded the Collegiate Church of Wurzen (Kollegiatstift Wurzen), dependent on the Hochstift Meissen, dedicated in 1114, which he endowed with the income from the burgward of Pouch, the tolls of Wurzen and various pieces of land. He was also buried there.

At the end of his episcopate, in 1119, a crusade began against the Sorbs, which had clearly been preceded by bitter conflict in the border areas.

Preceded by Saint Benno of Meissen	Bishop of Meissen; 1106–1119	Succeeded by Godebold of Meissen
