= Martin of Meissen =

Bishop of Meissen

Martin (died 15 July 1190) was Bishop of Meissen from 1170 to 1190.

He was supposed to have originated from the vicinity of Petersberg Abbey. Before his elevation to the episcopate, he was a cathedral canon in Meissen. He was among the participants of the Third Lateran Council in 1179. Altzella Abbey was founded during his episcopate, and he made written gifts to it of lands still in dispute. Other monasteries were also founded in this period. He maintained friendly relations with Margrave Otto II, Margrave of Meissen.

Martin died while on the Third Crusade near the city of Tyre.

== Bibliography ==
- Eduard Machatschek: Geschichte der Bischöfe des Hochstiftes Meissen in chronologischer Reihenfolge (...), pp. 128–135. Dresden 1884
- Heribert Smolinsky: Martin. In: Neue Deutsche Biographie (NDB). Volume 16, Duncker & Humblot, Berlin 1990, ISBN 978-3-428-00197-2 , p. 276 ( digital copy ).

Preceded by Gerung of Meissen	Bishop of Meissen; 1170–1190	Succeeded by Dietrich von Kittlitz
