= Dietrich I of Meissen =

Bishop of Meissen

Dietrich I, otherwise known as Theoderich (died 1039 or 1040), was Bishop of Meissen from 1024 to late 1039 or early 1040.

== Life ==
Dietrich was consecrated as Bishop of Meissen by Humfrid, Archbishop of Magdeburg. There is no information on his previous life or career. He founded St. Afra's Priory, Meissen. He took part in the Synod of Frankfurt of 1027 convened by Emperor Conrad II, of which Wolfhere of Hildesheim gave an account.

During his episcopate Meissen and Lusatia became a theatre of war between the Emperor and Mieszko II Lambert. The Emperor destroyed the temples and idols of the Wends and excluded those who refused to convert to Christianity from any position of power or privilege.

Dietrich died either at the end of 1039 or in the first half of 1040. He was buried in Meissen Cathedral but no monument has survived.

Preceded by Hugbert	Bishop of Meissen; 1024–1039 or -40	Succeeded by Eido II
