= Bruno I of Meissen =

Bishop of Meissen

Bruno I of Meissen (died in or shortly after 1065) was Bishop of Meissen from 1046 to 1065.

The existence of Bishop Bruno I is supported by only three documents, deeds of gift from Wilhelm IV of Weimar, who was Margrave of Meissen until 1062.

Most of the earlier bishops of Meissen are poorly documented. Different chroniclers have given different lists of them and thus made it more difficult to establish an accurate chronology. A Bishop Meinward was included in earlier chronologies between Eido II and Bruno I, but Meinward has been shown to be nothing more than a misplaced transcription error for Bishop Reinward (1140–1150); Bruno thus succeeded Eido directly.

Preceded by Eido II	Bishop of Meissen; 1046–approx. 1065	Succeeded by Reiner of Meissen
