= Eilward =

Bishop of Meissen

Eilward (also noted as Agilward, Elvart, Eilbart, Erward, Ediward, Eduard, Hildeward or Hildebert; d. 24 November 1023), a member of the Saxon noble house of the Ekkehardiner(de), was Bishop of Meissen from 1016 to 1023.

Eilward, a younger son of Margrave Ekkehard I of Meissen and his wife Schwanhild, daughter of Hermann Billung, was appointed bishop by Emperor Henry II. During his years in office his brother was Margrave of Meissen as Hermann I.

| Preceded by Eido I | Bishop of Meissen; 1016–1023 | Succeeded by Hugbert |
