= Magnus Gottfried Lichtwer =

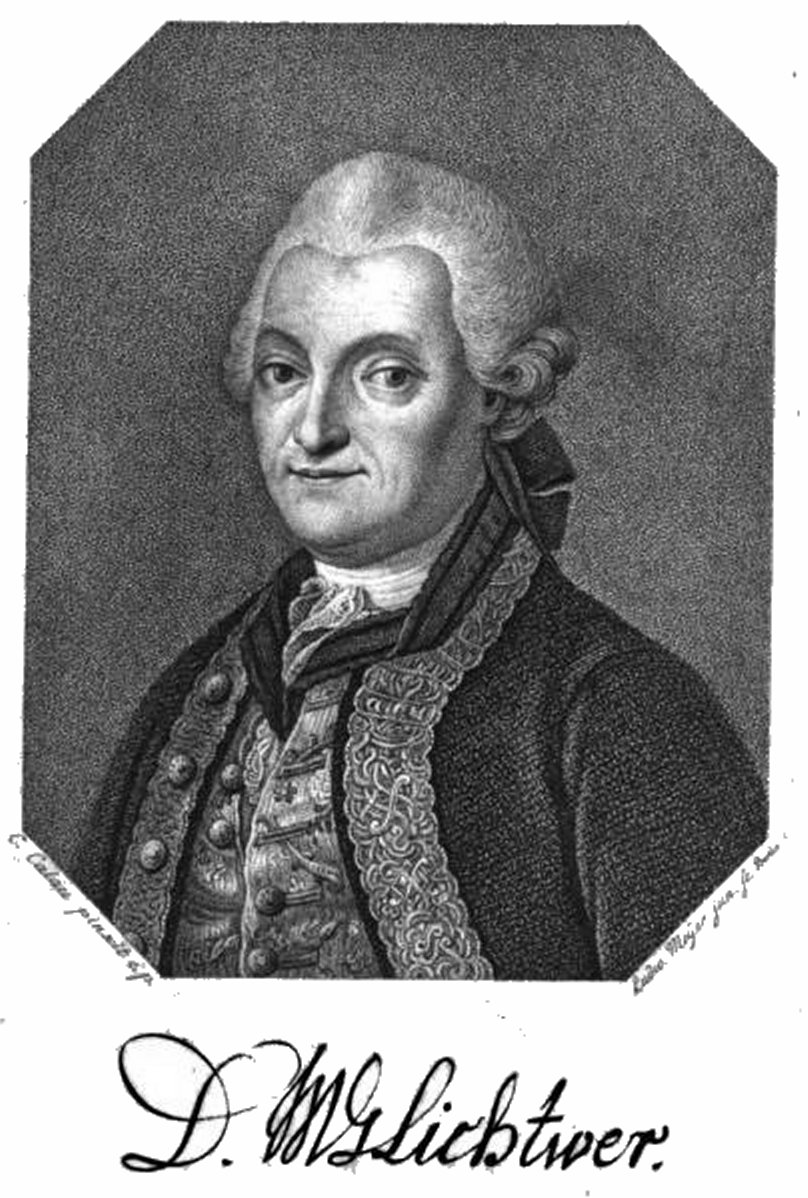

Magnus Gottfried Lichtwer (30 January 1719, in Wurzen – 7 July 1783, in Halberstadt) was a German fabulist.

== Biography ==
His father of the same name was a jurist. The younger Lichtwer studied law at Leipzig and Wittenberg. His chief work is to be found in the Vier Bücher Aesopischer Fabeln (Four books of fables in the manner of Aesop; 1748). There is a collection of his Schriften (Writings; 1828) edited by Ernst Ludwig von Pott (Lichtwer's grandson) and Friedrich Cramer which contains a biography. The Austrian composer Joseph Haydn set several of his fables in his secular canons, or a capella songs (Hob. XXVIIb).
