= Konrad von Wallhausen =

Bishop of Meissen

Konrad von Wallhausen otherwise Konrad I of Meissen or Konrad I von Wallhausen (died 6 January 1258) was Bishop of Meissen from 1240 to 1258.

His episcopate, about which there is little information, coincided with the Interregnum and the War of the Thuringian Succession.

Preceded by Heinrich of Meissen	Bishop of Meissen; 1240–1258	Succeeded by Albrecht von Mutzschen
