= Eido I =

Bishop of Meissen

Eido I, also Ido, Eid or Ägidius (955 – 20 December 1015), was the bishop of Meissen from 992 to 1015.

== Life ==
Eido, thought to have been a member of the noble von Colditz family, belonged to the cathedral chapter of Magdeburg. His appointment as bishop of Meissen in 992 was on the recommendation of Giselher, Archbishop of Magdeburg.

Among the major events of his period of office was the dispute over the restoration of the bishopric of Merseburg, which had been abolished in 981 by the efforts of Giselher, and of its territories to the east of the Mulde which had fallen to the bishopric of Meissen. Eido was successful in retaining those territories for Meissen even after the restoration of the bishopric of Merseburg in 1004. Although measures had been taken in the court of Otto III to readjust the boundaries, they remained without effect.

Bishop Thietmar of Merseburg, appointed in 1009, reported in Book 7 of his Chronicle that Eido died on 20 December 1015 while travelling through urbs Libzi: this is the first written reference to the town of Leipzig. His body was escorted by Hildeward, bishop of Zeitz, back to Meissen, where it was buried.

== Literature ==
- Knut Görich: Otto III. Romanus Saxonicus et Italicus (p. 171). Jan Thorbecke Verlag Sigmaringen 1995
- Friedrich Wilhelm Ebeling: Die deutschen Bischöfe bis zum Ende des sechzehnten Jahrhunderts (2nd vol., p. 223.). Verlag Otto Wiegand, Leipzig 1858 (online)
- Eduard Machatschek: Geschichte der Bischöfe des Hochstiftes Meissen in chronologischer Reihenfolge: Zugleich en Beitrag zur Culturgeschichte der Mark Meissen und des Herzog und Kurfürstenthums Sachsens. Nach dem „Codex diplomaticus Saxoniae regiae“, anderen glaubwürdigen Quellen und bewährten Geschichtswerken bearbeitet (pp. 24-31). C.C. Meinhold, Dresden 1884
- Ernst Gotthelf Gersdorf: Urkundenbuch des Hochstifts Meissen, vol. 1, p. XVI (online)
- Willi Rittenbach, Siegfried Seifert: Geschichte der Bischöfe von Meißen 968-1581 (pp. 29–38). St.-Benno-Verlag, Leipzig 1965
- Walter Schlesinger (1959). "Eid (Eiko)". Neue Deutsche Biographie (in German). Vol. 4. Berlin: Duncker & Humblot. p. 388. (full text online).
- Thietmar von Merseburg: Chronik (= Ausgewählte Quellen zur Deutschen Geschichte des Mittelalters. Freiherr-vom-Stein-Gedächtnisausgabe, Bd. 9), newly translated and revised by Werner Trillmich, Darmstadt 1957 (several new editions). Older edition: Die Chronik Thietmar's, Bischofs von Merseburg, nach der Ausgabe der Monumenta Germaniae übers. von J.C.M. Laurent (online)

Preceded by Volkold	Bishop of Meissen; 992–1015	Succeeded by Eilward
