= Gerung of Meissen =

Bishop of Meissen

Gerung (died 20 November 1170) was bishop of Meissen from 1152 to 1170, and previously abbot of Posa or Bosau Abbey.

His time as bishop is particularly remembered for the treaty which he agreed in 1154 with the immigrant Flemish settlers in Kühren. Also during Gerung's time in office Vladislaus II, Duke of Bohemia, because of border disputes with the Margravate of Meissen, overran the territory of the bishopric and caused much destruction, for which when he became king he compensated the bishop.

In 1160 Gerung took part with other bishops in an Imperial Diet in Erfurt, to discuss the suppression of the revolt in Milan against Emperor Frederick I. In 1163 he sat in judgment with the Emperor on the murderers of Archbishop Arnold of Selenhofen in Mainz, with serious consequences for the city, which suffered the loss of several important rights.

Gerung fell ill during a visit to Petersberg Abbey and died there. His body was transported for burial to Meissen Cathedral.

== Bibliography ==
- Eduard Machatschek: Geschichte der Bischöfe des Hochstiftes Meissen in chronologischer Reihenfolge (...), pp. 120–128. Dresden 1884

Preceded by Albrecht I of Meissen	Bishop of Meissen; 1152–1170	Succeeded by Martin of Meissen
