= Hermann Ilgen =

German pharmacist and businessman

Hermann Ilgen

Friedrich Hermann Ilgen (22 July 1856 in Wurzen – 15 April 1940 in Dresden) was a German pharmacist, businessman and patron of art and sport.

== Biography ==
Ilgen was born on July 22, 1856, in Wurzen in a middle-class family. His father Ferdinand Ilgen wanted him to study theology. Ilgen completed an apprenticeship as a pharmacist in the Ore Mountains and then three years of practice as a pharmacist's assistant, before he enrolled in 1878 to study pharmacy and chemistry at the University of Leipzig. Among other things, he studied there with Hermann Kolbe. Ilgen was a member of what was then the Pharmaceutical and Natural Sciences Association in Leipzig (which later became the Corps Vandalia Leipzig). Since 1880, he worked as an employed pharmacist in Freiberg.

In 1882 Ilgen took over the "Lion Pharmacy" in Bahnhofstraße in Kötzschenbroda for the enormous purchase price of 120,000 marks. During this time, he brought a new type of rat and mouse poison onto the market, the phosphorus pill, which he was able to sell successfully worldwide, earning not only a large fortune but also the nickname "Mouse Death". To increase the “attractiveness for the mice”, Ilgen shipped his phosphorus pills, which he had produced in a nearby shed, in wooden boxes in which cured meat had previously been transported. the smell of which was transferred to the goods to be shipped.

In 1883 Ilgen married Anna Mathilde Steffen from Leipzig, which made him related to the wealthy Leipzig architect Otto Heinrich Steffen. His wife owned valuable property near today's Leipzig Central Station. In the same year, Ilgen became a co-founder of the Sparkasse in Kötzschenbroda, which moved into a building right next to his pharmacy.

== Patronship ==
At the beginning of the 1930s, Hermann Ilgen was the main sponsor of the renovation of the Wurzen Cathedral.
