= Burchard of Meissen =

German saint, bishop of Meissen

Saint Burchard of Meissen (died 25 September 969) was the first Bishop of Meissen, from 968.

Archbishop Adalbert of Magdeburg consecrated him in Magdeburg as the first Bishop of Meissen, where he established the first cathedral chapter of Meissen.

The only documented facts about him are his name, the details of his consecration and the date of his death. In the absence of facts a traditional account of his death developed, to the effect that he died on 14 June in either 970 or 972 from a fall from his horse, but this is not supported by any evidence.

He is sometimes said to have been a Benedictine monk from St. Emmeram's Abbey, Regensburg, or St. John's Abbey, Magdeburg (Kloster Berge), but there is no documented evidence of this either.

He is venerated as a saint; his feast day is 14 June.

== Literature ==
- Machatschek, Eduard: Geschichte der Bischöfe des Hochstiftes Meissen in chronologischer Reihenfolge: Zugleich ein Beitrag zur Culturgeschichte der Mark Meissen und des Herzog und Kurfürstenthums Sachsens. Nach dem Codex diplomaticus Saxoniae regiae, anderen glaubwürdigen Quellen und bewährten Geschichtswerken bearbeitet (pp. 11–19). C. C. Meinhold, Dresden 1884 (in German)
- Sauser, Ekkart (1999). "Burchard". In Bautz, Traugott (ed.). Biographisch-Bibliographisches Kirchenlexikon (BBKL) (in German). Vol. 16. Herzberg: Bautz. cols. 251–252. ISBN 3-88309-079-4. (in German)
- Rittenbach, Willi, and Seifert, Siegfried: Geschichte der Bischöfe von Meißen 968-1581 St. Benno, Leipzig 1965 (in German)

Preceded by no predecessor; newly-created diocese in 968	Bishop of Meissen; 968–969	Succeeded by Volkold
