= Bruno von Porstendorf =

Bishop of Meissen

Bruno von Porstendorf otherwise Bruno II of Meissen or Bruno II von Porstendorf (died 4 December 1228) was Bishop of Meissen from 1209 to 1228.

In older lists of the bishops of Meissen he is numbered as Bruno III because of the inclusion of an earlier Bruno II, who was a clerical error.

== Life ==
Along with the Přemyslid Kings of Bohemia Bruno was one of the most active participants in the German settlement of Upper Lusatia. For one thing, this was the location of the majority of the estates of the bishops of Meissen; for another, Bruno was keen in this way to secure his power in Upper Lusatia against the inroads of the Bohemians.

In 1228 he was removed from his office by Pope Gregory IX, presumably because of his reckless behaviour, and died on 4 December in the same year. His body was buried in the crypt of the collegiate church in Bautzen, which he had founded himself between 1213 and 1218.

In 1225 Bruno dedicated the Chapel of St. George in the Matthias Gate in Ortenburg, Bautzen.

== Sources ==
- Enno Bünz: Der Meißner Bischof Bruno von Porstendorf (1209/10–1228). Herkunft – Aufstieg – Rücktritt – Pensionierung. In: Neues Archiv für sächsische Geschichte. 77 (2006), pp. 1–36
- Thomas Ludwig, 2008: Die Urkunden der Bischöfe von Meissen: diplomatische Untersuchungen zum 10.-13. Jahrhundert. Volume 10 of Archiv für Diplomatik: Beiheft. Böhlau Verlag Köln Weimar ISBN 9783412259051

Preceded by Dietrich von Kittlitz	Bishop of Meissen; 1191–1208	Succeeded by Heinrich of Meissen
