= Heinrich of Meissen =

Bishop of Meissen

Heinrich of Meissen (died 24 June 1240) was Bishop of Meissen from December 1228 to his death.

Heinrich was probably a member of the Von Plaue family, ministeriales of the Archbishop of Magdeburg. Before his elevation, he was provost of the Magdeburg Cathedral chapter. He seems to have enjoyed the favour of the Emperor Frederick II, who granted him the rights to the metal mines discovered within the boundaries of the church of Meissen, as well as to auriferous, or gold-bearing, rivers and bodies of waters: in the deed of grant the Emperor refers to the bishop as dilectus princeps ("beloved prince"). (There is however no extant original of this deed, and some authorities consider it a forgery, for example, Hubert Ermisch).

In 1237 Heinrich was with the Emperor on his campaign to Brescia, preparatory to the Siege of Brescia in the following year.

Preceded by Bruno von Porstendorf	Bishop of Meissen; 1228–1240	Succeeded by Konrad von Wallhausen
