= Leipzig University Library =

University library in Germany

Leipzig University Library Universitätsbibliothek Leipzig
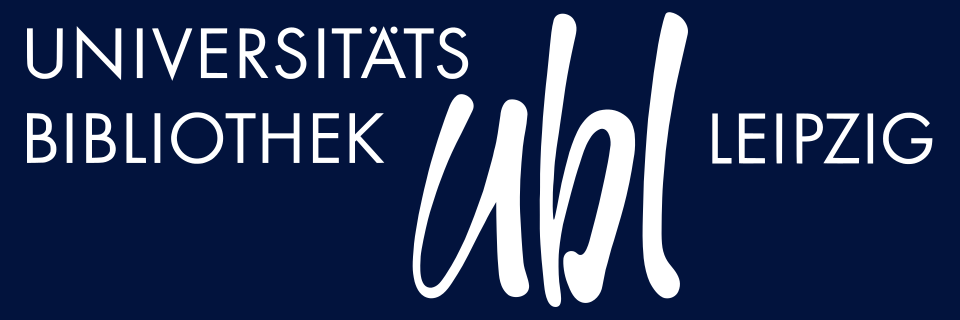

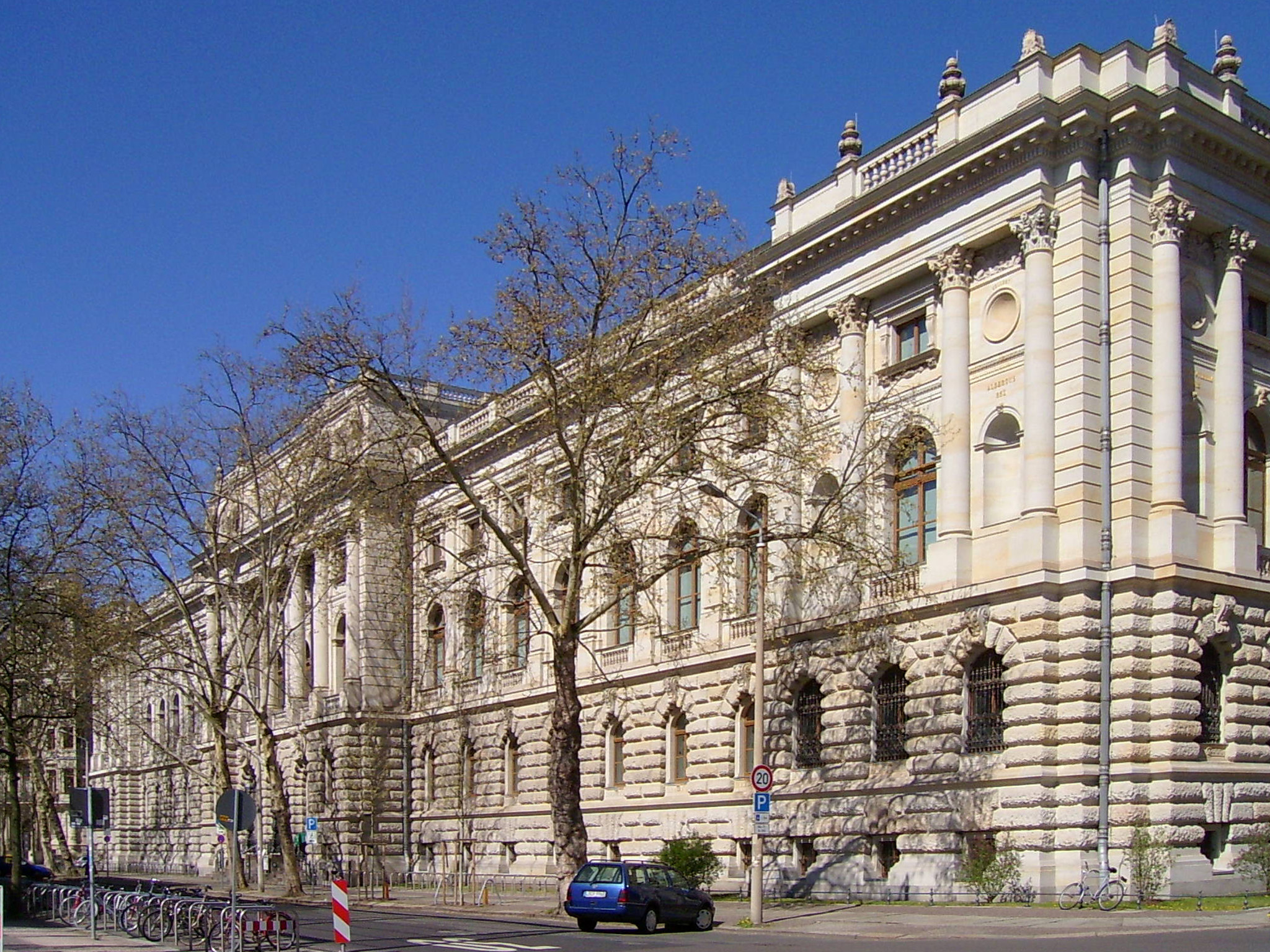
- 51°19′57″N 12°22′06″E
- Location: Beethovenstraße 6, Leipzig, Germany (main building), Germany
- Type: University library
- Established: 1543

Collection
- Items collected: books, journals, newspapers, magazines, databases, maps, prints, drawings, incunabula and manuscripts
- Size: >5,500,000

Access and use
- Access requirements: Open to anyone with a need to use the collections and services

Other information
- Director: Ulrich Johannes Schneider
- Website: www.ub.uni-leipzig.de/start/

Leipzig University Library (German: Universitätsbibliothek Leipzig), known also as Bibliotheca Albertina, is the central library of the University of Leipzig. It is one of the oldest German university libraries.

== History ==
The library was founded in 1542 following the Reformation by the then Rector of the university, Caspar Borner, who persuaded Moritz, Duke of Saxony, to donate the property and buildings of the dissolved Dominican friary of St Paul in Leipzig to the university. The library began in one of the monastery buildings with 1,000 books and around 1,500 manuscripts from the stocks of four secularised Leipzig city monasteries and other dissolved monasteries in Saxony and Thuringia. Its land and buildings fell in 1543 by donation of the Albertiners Duke Moritz of Saxony to the University of Leipzig. In one of these buildings, the Central Paleum, the library collections of several monasteries were brought together.

Due to the strong growth in the number of books, as well as the takeover of the Goethe collection by the publisher Salomon Hirzel, and above all due to the increasing production of publishing in the 19th century, a move into a larger building became necessary. Many building designs were submitted to one call, and on 15 and 16 October 1883, a court of appeal discussed the ten proposals selected for the final round and decided on the project by Arwed Rossbach. Building was complete on 24 October 1891. In honor to King Albert of Saxony, the new building in the Musikviertel neighbourhood was named Bibliotheca Albertina.

In the Second World War, the main building was severely damaged by the air raids on Leipzig on 6 April 1945. The catalogs and stocks, however, had been outsourced and remained largely intact. Approximately 42,000 volumes were lost. Currently some are found in collections of Russian libraries. After the war only the undamaged left wing was used. Reconstruction of the main building was a shortage of financial resources. Because of the damage to the main building, the use of the institutes and section libraries has often been shifted in the following decades.

It was not until after the German reunification that the extensive restoration and extension of the main building, including the reconstruction of individual buildings, has begun in 1994. The ruins of the right wing were removed entirely, a second cellar floor lifted, and the façade – despite considerable additional costs – was reconstructed in the original way. Renovation, restoration and restoration lasted until 2002.

Today, the main building of the University Library, the Bibliotheca Albertina, is one of a total of 15 locations of the University Library.

Bombing in 1943–1945 destroyed two-thirds of the Neo-Renaissance Bibliotheca Albertina building.

Three famous librarians worked at the institution: Joachim Feller (from 1675), Christian Gottlieb Jöcher (from 1742 to 1758), and Ernst Gotthelf Gersdorf (from 1833). Since 2005 Ulrich Johannes Schneider has been director of the library.

== Collections ==
The Bibliotheca Albertina is the center for the media acquisition with a central business operation for numerous branch libraries as well as for the interlibrary loan. Central technical facilities such as bookbinding and restoration works are also located in the Bibliotheca Albertina.

The collection currently comprises over 5.5 million volumes, with 8,700 manuscripts and 3,600 incunabula, and some 25,000 prints dating from the 16th century, and around 6,500 journals. Approximately 3.5 million of the total stock is now stocked in the magazines, the remaining stocks are freely accessible in the three main readings rooms.

In addition, the library has a series of special collections, including about 8,700 manuscripts, of which approximately 3,200 in the special collection of oriental manuscripts, approximately 3,600 incunabulae, 16th century prints and approximately 173,000 autographs. There is also a significant collection of Papyrus and Ostracs. Among the collections is the Papyrus Ebers, one of the oldest medical treatises ever (around 1525 BC) or the Leipziger Weltchronik, the remains of the oldest preserved world chronicle (2nd century AD). Papyrus Ebers is the longest and oldest surviving medical manuscript from ancient Egypt, dated to around 1600 BC.

In 2010 the library was given 12 sketchbooks and a number of diaries of the late Leipzig artist Werner Tübke.

In 2014 an early, unknown manuscript fragment of the Parzival of Wolfram von Eschenbach was found in the holdings of the handwriting center. The fragment is housed in a handwriting book of the Domstiftsbibliothek Naumburg and served as bookbinding material in the 15th century.

The Leipzig University Library owns parts of the Codex Sinaiticus, a Bible manuscript from the 4th century, brought from Sinai in 1843 by Constantin von Tischendorf. The Codex contains large parts of the Old Testament and a complete New Testament in ancient Greek, and is one of the most important known manuscripts of the Greek Old Testament and the New Testament. It is the oldest fully preserved copy of the New Testament.

Since 2014, the library has been developing the specialist information service for media, communication and film science "adlr.link". A central search portal for scientists has been online since 2016.

== Gallery ==
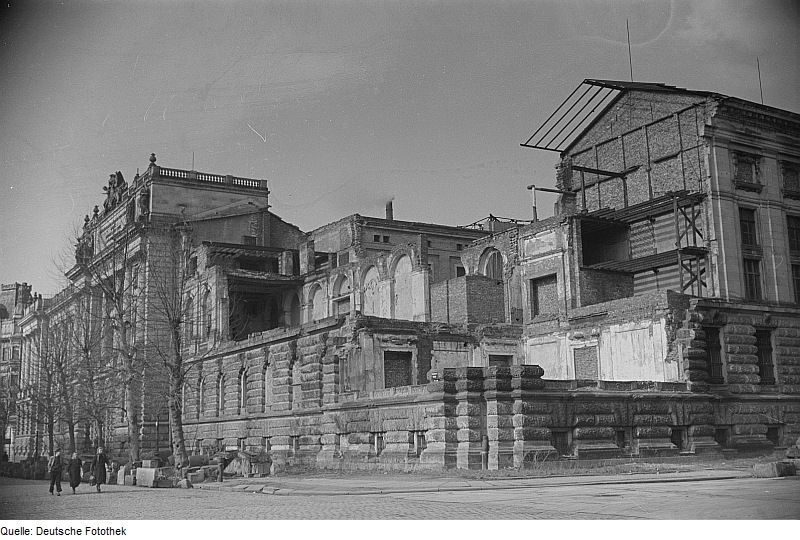
Damaged main building in 1953

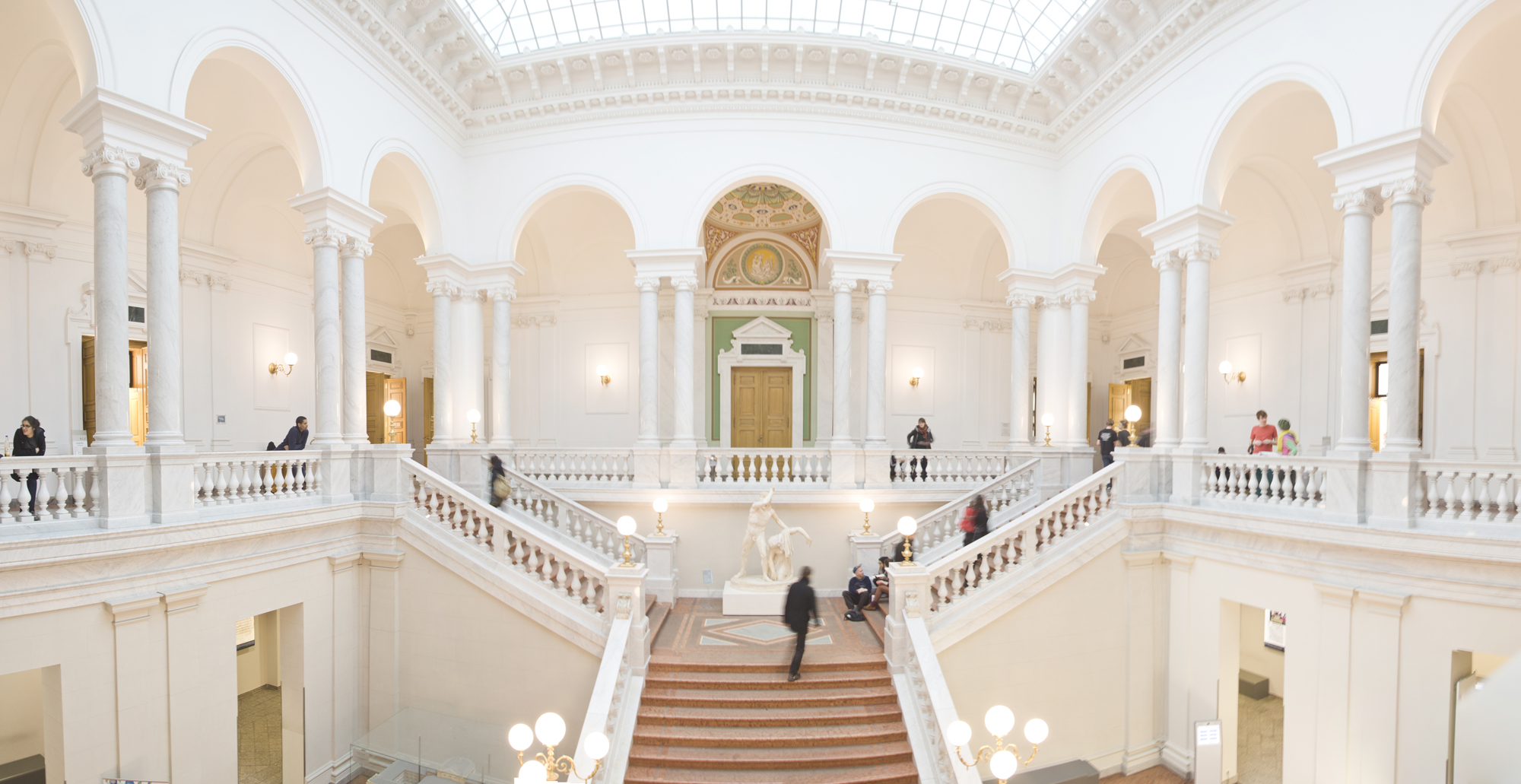
Bibliotheca Albertina entrance hall

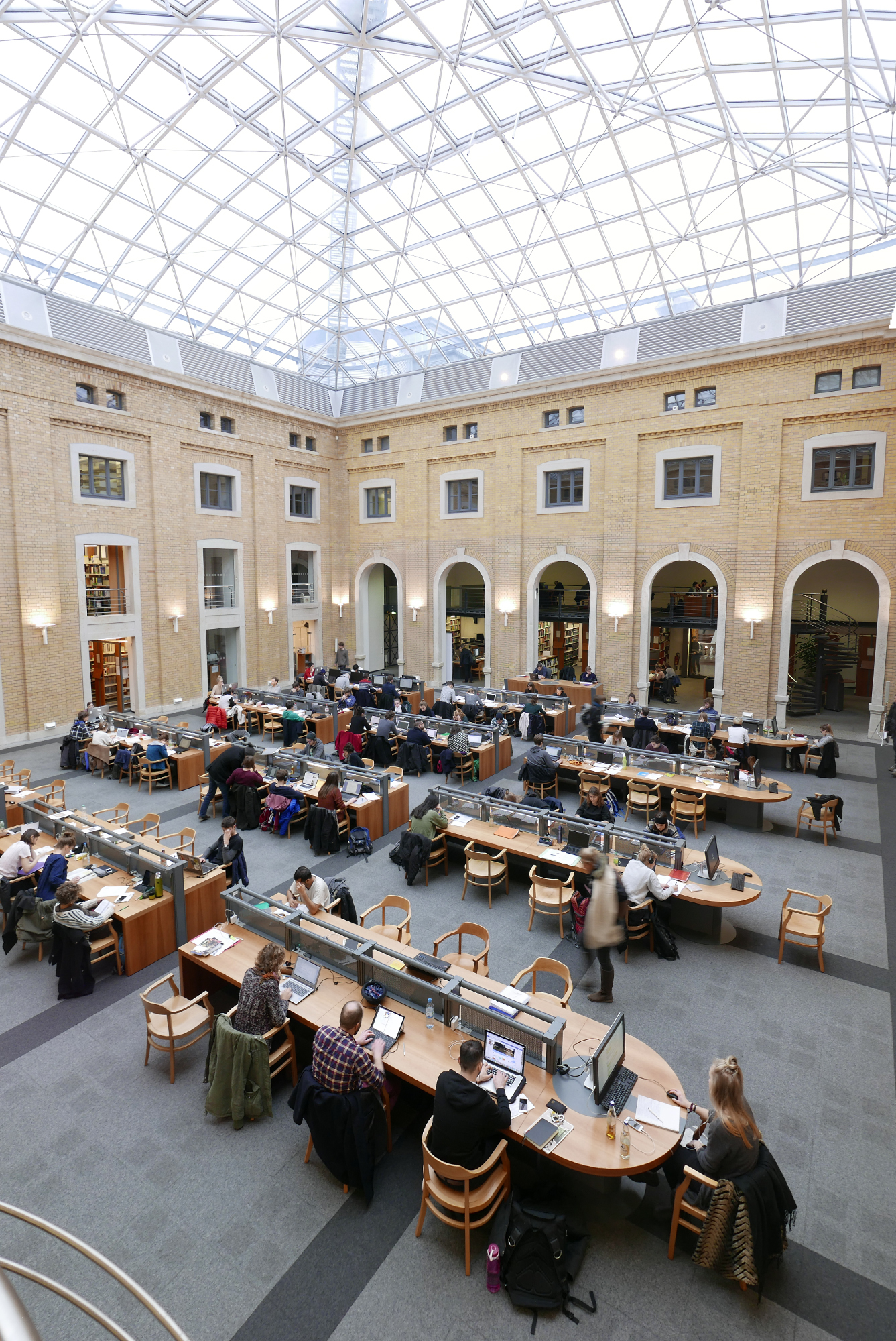
Bibliotheca Albertina reading room west

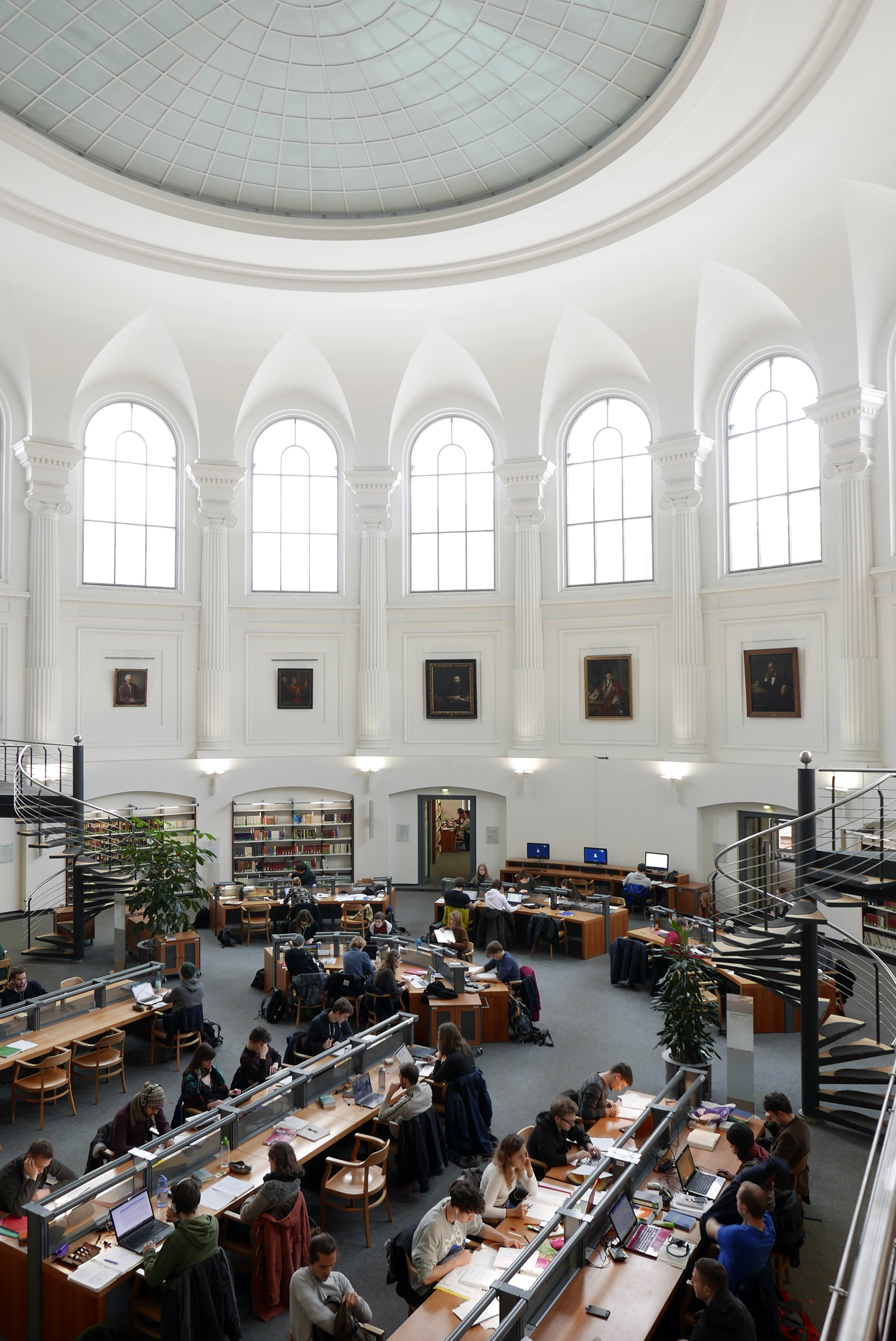
Bibliotheca Albertina central reading room

== See also ==
- Architecture of Leipzig – Italian Neorenaissance
