= Albrecht I of Meissen =

Bishop of Meissen

Albrecht I of Meissen (died 1 August 1152) was Bishop of Meissen from 1150 to 1152.

== Life ==
Albrecht I is not extensively documented. He was supposedly from a family of the Sorbian nobility. Before his elevation to the bishopric he was a cathedral provost. Otto von Freising mentions Albrecht in 1151 in connection with the dispute between Friedrich II of Berg and Herman van Horne over the office of bishop of Utrecht.

With the agreement of the Pope, the bishopric of Meissen, like that of Naumburg, was under the protection of Burggraf Conrad I of Meissen, in return for which the bishops were expected to undertake appropriate tasks from time to time. At the beginning of 1152 Conrad III entrusted Albrecht, who had the reputation of being talented at languages, with a diplomatic mission to the Byzantine Emperor Manuel I Komnenos. The bishop died either on the way to Constantinople or in the city itself.

== Literature ==
- Eduard Machatschek: Geschichte der Bischöfe des Hochstiftes Meissen in chronologischer Reihenfolge (...), pp. 116–120. Dresden 1884

Preceded by Reinward	Bishop of Meissen; 1150–1152	Succeeded by Gerung of Meissen
