= Ulrich Johannes Schneider =

German librarian and historian of philosophy

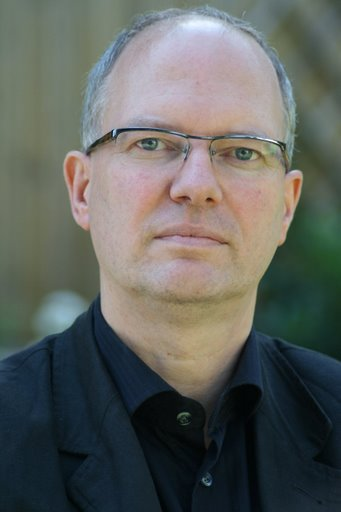
Ulrich Johannes Schneider in August 2007.

Ulrich Johannes Schneider (born 4 May 1956) is a German librarian and historian of philosophy. Since 2005 he has been the director of the Leipzig University Library.
