= Reiner of Meissen =

Bishop of Meissen

Reiner of Meissen, also noted as Rainer, Reginbert, Rogmer or Reinbert (died 1066), was Bishop of Meissen from 1065 to 1066. He was consecrated by Werner of Steusslingen, Archbishop of Magdeburg.

Preceded by Bruno I of Meissen	Bishop of Meissen; 1065–1066	Succeeded by Kraft of Meissen
