= Dietrich von Kittlitz =

Bishop of Meissen

Dietrich von Kittlitz otherwise Dietrich II of Meissen or Dietrich II von Kittlitz (died 29 August 1208) was Bishop of Meissen from 1191 to 1208.

He was a member of the noble family of Kittlitz. During his episcopate the Priory of St. Afra in Meissen was founded, in 1205.

== Bibliography ==
- Eduard Machatschek: Geschichte der Bischöfe des Hochstiftes Meissen in chronologischer Reihenfolge (...), pp. 136–145. Dresden 1884

Preceded by Martin of Meissen	Bishop of Meissen; 1191–1208	Succeeded by Bruno von Porstendorf
