= Bishop of Dresden-Meissen =

Catholic ecclesial title in Germany

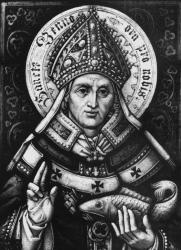
Benno of Meissen

The Bishop of Dresden-Meissen is the ordinary of the Roman Catholic Diocese of Dresden-Meissen in the ecclesiastical Province of Berlin.

The diocese covers an area of 16,934 km^{2} (6,538 sq mi) and was erected as the Diocese of Meissen on 24 June 1921. The name was changed to Dresden-Meissen on 15 November 1979.

== Bishops and administrators of Meissen (968–1581) ==
Name	from	to
Saint Burchard of Meissen	968	969 or 970
Volkold or Volkrad	970 or 972	992
Eido I or Ido, Ägidius	992	1015
Eilward or Agilward, Hildward (Ekkehardiner)	1016	1023
Hugbert, Hukbrecht or Hubert	1023	1024
Dietrich I	1024	1040
Eido II or Ido (anti-bishop)	1040	1046
Meinward - a mistaken addition by early chroniclers based on a misreading		
Bruno I	1046	1065
Reiner or Rainer	1065	1066
Kraft or Krafto, appointed, but did not take office	1066	
Saint Benno of Meissen, Count of Woldenburg	1066	c. 1105–1107 (an unsupported date of 16 June 1106 is often given)
Herwig or Hartwig	c. 1106–1108	1118 or 1119
Grambert - a mistaken addition by early chroniclers based on a misreading		
Godebold or Godebald, Gotthold	1119	1140
Reinward	1140	1150
Berthold - a mistaken addition by early chroniclers		
Albrecht I of Meissen	1150	1152
Bruno II - mistakenly added by early chroniclers based on a misdating of Bruno I		
Gerung of Meissen	1152	1170
Martin of Meissen	1170	1190
Dietrich II von Kittlitz	1191	1208
Bruno II von Porstendorf or Bruno III	1209	maybe 1228
Heinrich of Meissen	1228	1240
Konrad I von Wallhausen	1240	1258
Albrecht II von Mutzschen	1258	1266
Withego I von Furra or Witticho	1266	1293
Bernhard von Kamenz	1293	1296
Albrecht III of Leisnig, Albrecht III Burgrave of Leisnig	1296 or 1297	1312
Withego II von Colditz or Witticho	1312	1341 or 1342
Wilhelm of Meissen (anti-bishop)	1312	1314
Johann I von Isenburg or Count of Eisenberg?	1341 or 1342	1370
Dietrich von Schönberg, appointed, but did not take office	1370	
Konrad II von Kirchberg-Wallhausen	1370 or 1371	1375
Dietrich III of Meissen (anti-bishop)	1370	1373
Johann von Genzenstein	1375 or 1376	1379
Nikolaus I Ziegenbock	1379	1392
Johann III von Kittlitz und zu Baruth	1393	1398
Thimo von Colditz	1399	1410
Rudolf von der Planitz	1411	1427
Johann IV von Schweidnitz	1427	1451
Caspar von Schönberg	1451	1463
Dietrich III von Schönberg	1463	1476
Johann V von Weißenbach	1476	1487
Johann VI von Saalhausen	1487	1518
Johann VII von Schleinitz	1518	1537
Johann VIII von Maltitz	1537 or 1538	1549
Nicolaus II von Carlowitz or Karlowitz	1550	1555
Johann IX von Haugwitz	1555	1559/81
Johann Leisentrit (administrator for the diocesan area outside of Saxony)	1560/67	

The Bishops resided until 1595 in Wurzen. In 1559 the diocesan temporalities within Saxony were seized by the Electorate of Saxony.

== Apostolic prefects of Meissen (1567–1921) ==
In the Meisen diocesan area located outside of then Saxony in Lower and Upper Lusatia there was no immediate overlord, since the then liege lord of the Two Lusatias, the Catholic king of Bohemia (in personal union Holy Roman Emperor) held the Lusatias as fief outright. The Kings of Bohemia did not effectively offend the spreading of the Protestant Reformation in the Two Lusatias. So it depended on the local vassals if Lutheranism prevailed or not, following the principle of Cuius regio, eius religio. The Two Lusatias thus became an area of regionally altering predominant denomination. In 1560 Meissen's last bishop John IX had appointed Johannes Leisentritt as diocesan administrator for the Lusatian part of the diocese, seated in Bautzen. After the Holy See had recognised as a matter of fact the suppression of the Meissen diocese within Saxony it converted its Lusatian part into an apostolic prefecture (Apostolic Prefecture of Meissen) in 1567 with administrator Leisentrit elevated to prefect. In canon law an apostolic prefecture is a diocese on approval.

According to its seat or its area comprised the prefecture was alternatively also called Apostolic Prefecture of Bautzen or Apostolic Prefecture of the Two Lusatias, respectively. When in 1635 the Lutheran Electorate of Saxony annexed the Two Lusatias it guaranteed in the cession contract (Traditionsrezess) with Bohemia to leave the existing religious relations untouched. As a signatory of the Peace of Westphalia of 1648 Saxony later agreed to maintain the religious status quo as given in the reference year of 1624 in all its territories acquired since. After the Prussian annexation of Lower Lusatia and easterly Upper Lusatia in 1815 the Holy See disentangled the newly Prussian diocesan area and incorporated it into the Prussian diocese of Breslau in 1821. The remaining diocese, officially always called Apostolic Prefecture of Meissen, was thus also called the Apostolic Prefecture of (Saxon) Upper Lusatia. The office of the apostolic prefect was held in personal union by the cathedral dean of Bautzen Cathedral. In the 19th century the episcopal function of the apostolic prefects was further emphasised by appointing them simultaneously with titular sees. In 1831-1841 and since 1846 until 1920 the Apostolic Vicars of the Saxony hereditary lands were also prefects of Lusatia.

Name	from	to
Johannes Leisentritt, as diocesan administrator until 1567, as Apostolic Prefect as of 1567	1560/67	1586
Gregor Leisentrit	1587	1594
Christoph von Blöbel	1594	1609
August Wiederin von Ottersbach	1609	1620
Gregor Kathmann von Maurugk	1620	1644
Johann Hasius von Lichtenfeld	1644	1650
Martin Saudrius von Sternfeld	1650	1655
Bernhard von Schrattenbach, vice-administrator of the prefecture	1655	1660
Christophorus Johannes Reinheld von Reichenau	1660	1665
Peter Franz Longinus von Kieferberg	1665	1675
Martin Ferdinand Brückner von Brückenstein	1676	1700
Matthäus Johann Josef Vitzki	1700	1713
Martin Bernhard Just von Friedenfels	1714	1721
Johann Josef Ignaz Freyschlag von Schmidenthal	1721	1743
Jakob Wosky von Bärenstamm	1743	1771
Carl Lorenz Cardona	1772	1773
Martin Nugk von Lichtenhoff	1774	1780
Johann Joseph Schüller von Ehrenthal	1780	1794
Wenzel Kobalz	1795	1796
Franz Georg Lock, titular bishop of Antigonea since 1801	1796	1831
Ignaz Bernhard Mauermann, apostolic vicar of the Saxon Hereditary Lands and titular bishop of Pella since 1819, Priest of Meissen; died in office	1831	14 September 1841
Matthäus Kutschank	1841	1844
Joseph Dittrich, simultaneously apostolic vicar of the Saxon Hereditary Lands and titular bishop of Corycus since 20 April 1846, Priest of Litomerice; died in office	1845	5 October 1853
Ludwig Forwerk, simultaneously apostolic vicar of the Saxon Hereditary Lands and titular bishop of Leontopolis in Augustamnica since 1854, Priest of Meissen; died in office	11 July 1854	8 January 1875
Franz Bernert, simultaneously apostolic vicar of the Saxon Hereditary Lands (28 January) and titular bishop of Azotus (18 March 1876), Priest of Litomerice; died in office	28 January 1876	18 March 1890
Ludwig Wahl, simultaneously apostolic vicar of the Saxon Hereditary Lands and titular bishop of Cucusus, Priest of Rottenburg; fell ill and resigned	11 July 1890	1904
Georg Wuschanski, as dean administrator of Bautzen for the prefecture since 1900, as apostolic vicar of the Saxon Hereditary Lands and titular bishop of Samos since 13 February 1904	1900	13 February 1904
Georg Wuschanski, simultaneously apostolic vicar of the Saxon Hereditary Lands and titular bishop of Samos, Priest of Meissen; died in office	13 February 1904	28 December 1905
Dr. Aloys Schäfer, simultaneously apostolic vicar of the Saxon Hereditary Lands and titular bishop of Abila Lysaniae, Priest of Meissen; died in office	4 April 1906	5 September 1914
Franz Löbmann, simultaneously apostolic vicar of the Saxon Hereditary Lands and titular bishop of Priene, Priest of Meissen; died in office	30 January 1915	4 December 1920
Jakub Skala, as administrator of the prefecture and for the apostolic vicariate of the Saxon Hereditary Lands	1920	1921

== Bishops of Meissen (and Dresden-Meissen as of 1980; 1921–present) ==
(Dates in italics indicate de facto continuation of office)

Tenure	Incumbent	Notes
12 August 1921 to 13 August 1930	Christian Schreiber, Bishop of Meissen	Priest of Fulda; ordained 14 September 1921; appointed first Bishop of Berlin
13 January 1931 to 21 May 1932	Conrad Gröber, Bishop of Meissen	Priest of Freiburg im Breisgau; ordained 1 February 1931; appointed Archbishop of Freiburg im Breisgau
9 September 1932 to 9 March 1951	Petrus Legge, Bishop of Meissen	Priest of Paderborn; ordained 28 October 1932; died in office
9 March 1951 to 19 August 1957	Heinrich Wienken, Bishop of Meissen	Coadjutor Bishop of Meissen; installed 29 November 1951; retired
23 June 1958 to 21 June 1970	Otto Spülbeck, Bishop of Meissen	Coadjutor Bishop of Meissen; installed 24 July 1958; died in office
12 September 1970 to 15 November 1979	Gerhard Schaffran, Bishop of Meissen	Auxiliary Bishop of Görlitz; installed 23 September 1970; becoming Bishop of Dresden-Meissen
15 November 1979 to 1 August 1987	Gerhard Schaffran, Bishop of Dresden-Meissen	Hitherto Bishop of Meissen; retired
2 January 1988 to 20 February 2012	Joachim Friedrich Reinelt, Bishop of Dresden-Meissen	Priest of Dresden-Meissen; ordained 20 February 1988; retired
18 January 2013 to 8 June 2015	Heiner Koch, Bishop of Dresden-Meissen	Priest of Cologne; Auxiliary Bishop of Cologne; installed 16 March 2013; appointed Archbishop-designate of the Roman Catholic Archdiocese of Berlin, in Berlin, Germany, by Pope Francis on Monday, June 8, 2015, to replace the previous Archbishop there, Cardinal Rainer Maria Woelki, who had earlier been transferred by Pope Francis to be Archbishop of the Roman Catholic Archdiocese of Cologne (Koln; Cologne, Germany)
since 29 April 2016	Heinrich Timmerevers, Bishop of Dresden-Meissen	Priest of Münster; Auxiliary Bishop of Münster)

== Notes ==
=== See also ===
- Lists of incumbents
