= Benno of Meissen =

Saxon saint and bishop (c. 1010–1106)

Saint Benno of Meissen
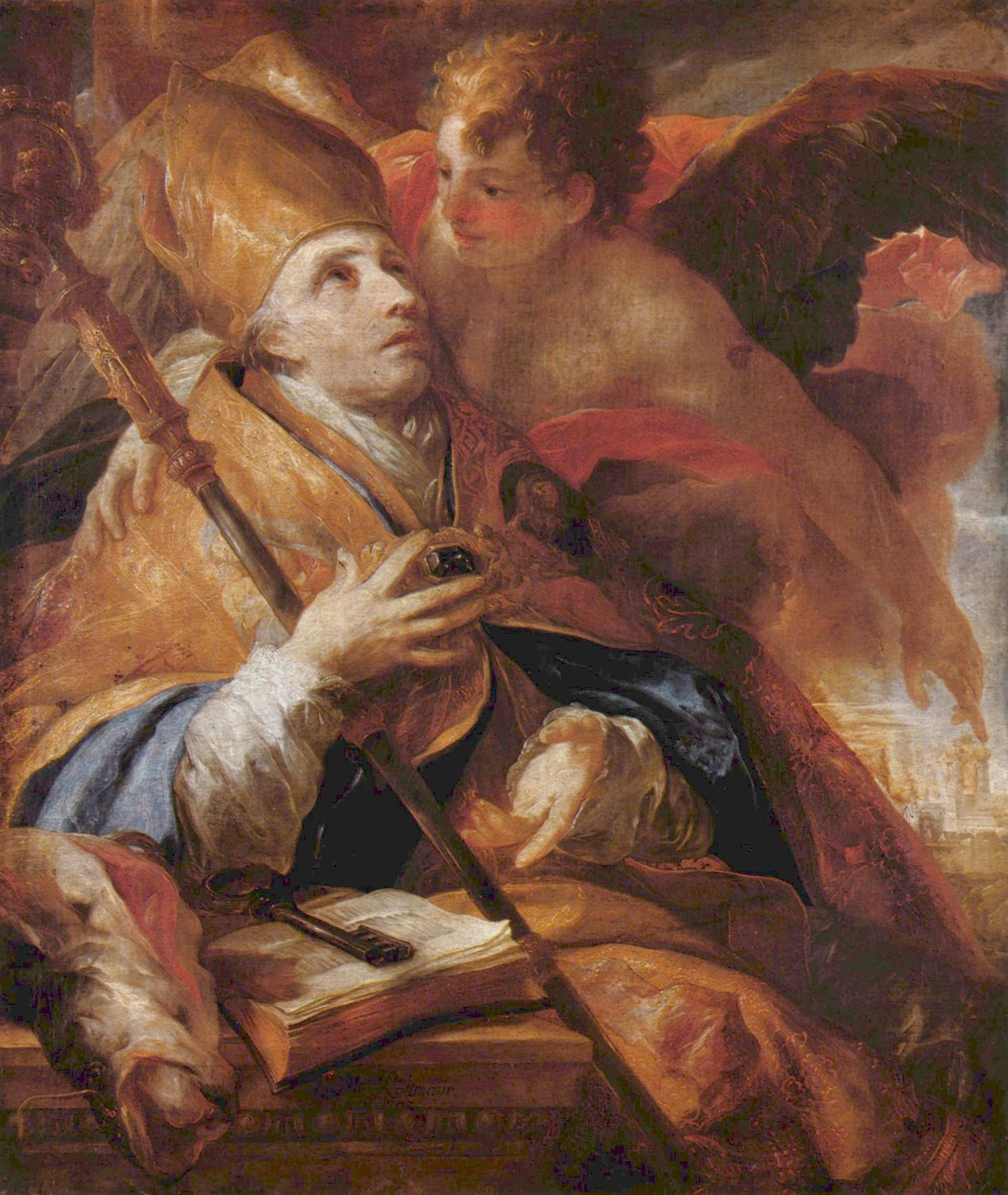
- Painting by Johann Michael Rottmayr, 1702; Alte Pinakothek, Munich

Confessor Bishop of Meissen Apostle of the Wends
- Born: c. 1010; Hildesheim, Duchy of Saxony
- Died: 16 June 1106; Meissen, Margraviate of Meissen
- Venerated in: Catholic Church
- Canonized: 31 May 1523 by Pope Adrian VI
- Major shrine: Munich, formerly Meissen
- Feast: 16 June
- Attributes: book, fish with keys in its mouth
- Patronage: fishermen, weavers, Dresden-Meissen, Munich

Benno (c. 1010 – 16 June 1106) was named Bishop of Meissen in 1066. Venerated since the 13th century, he was canonized in 1523. Benno did much for his diocese, both by ecclesiastical reforms on the Hildebrandine model and by material developments. He was venerated in his native Saxony throughout the Late Middle Ages.

== Sources ==
The first Vita was composed in 1460 by one Spedel, a Benedictine monk of St. Michael's monastery in Hildesheim. The second, by Jerome Emser, was published in 1512 as part of the efforts to have Benno canonized. In the last years of the fifteenth century and the first decades of the sixteenth century the canons of Meissen and George, Duke of Albertine Saxony, coordinated a campaign to achieve Benno's canonization. The canons sought the prestige of a canonized local bishop, and the duke sought a suitable model bishop for the reform of the church.

== Life ==
Little is known of Benno's early life. Born in Hildesheim, it is reported that he was the scion of a Saxon noble family, such as the Woldenburgs; and may have been educated at the monastery of St. Michael in Hildesheim. However it is certain that Benno was a canon of the Goslar chapter. In 1066 he was nominated by King Henry IV to the episcopal see of Meissen.

Benno appears as a supporter of the Saxon rebellion in 1073, though the chronicler Lambert of Hersfeld and other contemporary authorities attribute little weight to his share in it. Henry IV exiled Benno in 1075, but allowed him to return to his see the following year.

During the fierce Investiture Controversy, Benno supported Pope Gregory, and allegedly took part in the election of antiking Rudolf of Rheinfelden in 1077. After Rudolf's death he turned to the new antiking Hermann of Salm and was accordingly excommunicated and deprived of his bishopric by the 1085 Synod of Mainz. Benno betook himself to Archbishop Guibert of Ravenna, supported by Henry as Antipope Clement III, and by a penitent acknowledgment of his offences obtained from him both absolution and a letter of commendation to Henry, on the basis of which he was restored to his see.

Benno promised, apparently, to use his influence for peace with the Saxons, but again failed to keep his promise, returning in 1097 to the papal party and recognizing Urban II as the rightful pope. With this he disappears from authentic history; there is no evidence to support the later stories of his missionary activity and zeal for church-building and for ecclesiastical music. Benno died of natural causes on June 16, 1106.

== Veneration ==
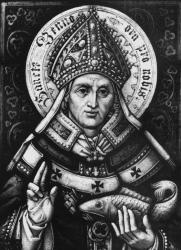
St Benno depicted with a fish in hand, two keys between its gills (stained glass from the Church of Saint Benno in Munich)

Benno did much for his diocese, both by ecclesiastical reforms on the Hildebrandine model and by material developments. Benno enjoyed veneration in his native Saxony throughout the later Middle Ages. Adrian VI issued the bull of canonization in 1523. Although Benno's sainthood had little to do with Luther's call for reform, once canonized he became a symbol for both sides of the reforming debate: Luther reviled him in early tracts against the cult of the saints. Catholic reformers turned him into a model of orthodoxy; and after Protestant mobs desecrated Benno's tomb in Meissen in 1539, the Wittelsbach dynasty ultimately made him patron saint of Munich and Old Bavaria.

For his part, the English Protestant John Foxe eagerly repeated the charges which Benno, who opposed Gregory VII, made against Henry IV during the Investiture Controversy, such as necromancy, torture of a former friend upon a bed of nails, commissioning an attempted assassination, executions without trials, unjust excommunication, doubting the Real Presence in the Eucharist, and even burning it.

Benno's feast day is 16 June. He is the patron-saint of anglers and weavers. His iconographic figures include a fish with keys in its mouth and a book. The reason for the fish is a legend that upon the excommunication of Henry IV the bishop told his canons to throw the keys to the cathedral into the Elbe; later a fisherman found the keys in a fish and brought them to the bishop.

== See also ==
- Catholic Church in Germany
- List of Catholic saints
- Saint Benno, patron saint archive

== Notes ==
Preceded by Kraft of Meissen	Bishop of Meissen; 1066–1106	Succeeded by Herwig of Meissen
