= Reinward =

Bishop of Meissen in the 12th century

Reinward (d. c. 1150) was Bishop of Meissen from 1140 to 1150.

He also appears under the variants Reinwald, Reinbert, Rembert, Reinhard, Reinwert or Richard. In old lists of bishops he further appears, incorrectly, as Meinward, Meinwert, Meinhard or Menward for the period 1046 to 1056 and as Grambert, Grambor, Grambod or Grambrecht for the period 1118 to 1125.

There is no information available about Reinward's family background. Before becoming bishop he was a cathedral provost in Meissen Cathedral. He also experienced the Second Crusade.

As for the length of his episcopate, older authorities such as Fabricius maintained that Reinward died on 24 July 1146 and was succeeded by a Bishop Berthold. Machatschek however found no evidence of Berthold and concluded that Reinward died in about 1150 and was directly succeeded by Albrecht I.

Preceded by Godebold of Meissen	Bishop of Meissen; 1140–1150	Succeeded by Albrecht I of Meissen
