= Eido II =

Bishop of Meissen

Eido II (also noted as Aico, Ido, Egidius, Aigo, Eiko or Heiko; died 1045 or 1046), was Bishop of Meissen from 1040 to 1045 or 1046.

Bishop Eido II is documented solely in the context of a gift by Emperor Henry III to the bishopric of Meissen, at the instigation and on the recommendation of Humfrid, Archbishop of Magdeburg, and Margrave Ekkehard I of Meissen; Eido is supposed to have been a friend of Ekkehard.

Eido's death, according to Machatschek, occurred either in the last part of 1045 or in the first half of 1046.

Preceded by Dietrich I of Meissen	Bishop of Meissen; 1040–1045 or -46	Succeeded by Bruno I of Meissen
