= Ruth Bodenstein-Hoyme =

German composer

Ruth Bodenstein-Hoyme (13 March 1924 – 11 January 2006) was a German composer and piano teacher.

== Life ==
Hoyme was born in Wurzen as the second daughter of the commercial gardener Walter Hoyme. She attended the elementary school and later for some years the state high school of the city. Against her father's will she took piano lessons. At the age of nine she had her first composition exercises. Through many countless performances, which she often reached overland on her own bicycle, she had saved up her own piano over the years. After high school she graduated from the Frauenfachschule für Hauswirtschaft in Düsseldorf-Kaiserswerth.

A fortunate circumstance brought her together in 1940 with the Leipzig pianist Elisabeth Knauth (b. 1894), who gave her inspiring piano and music theory lessons. She also encouraged Hoyme to study piano and prepared her for the entrance examination at the Leipzig Conservatory. She passed this examination in 1941, but she had to spend an unavoidable year of work in Stettin before she could begin her studies in 1942. Since Germany was at war, however, she had to work as a locksmith in the armaments industry. She therefore interrupted her studies until 1946.

She resumed her studies in 1947. The professors Oswin Kelle and Rudolf Fischer were her piano teachers, Paul Schenk taught her musical composition. Thanks to a teaching permit from the Academy of Music after the end of the war, she gave private piano lessons for children from Wurzen and Leipzig from 1946 to 1953. Several of them, including children in care, without fee. Hoyme also founded a singing circle in Wurzen, which wanted to distract people from the everyday worries of the post-war years through singing and music. With him she also travelled overland to the surroundings of Wurzen.

In 1953, Hoyme went to Dresden as a piano teacher at the Hochschule für Musik. She taught there until 1984. She continued her compositional studies, which she had already begun during her Leipzig studies with Johann Nepomuk David and Paul Schenk. In 1958 she married the bookseller Andreas Bodenstein. Her son Christof, born one year later, was taught music by his mother and finally made his debut as a singer at the Dresden Semperoper.

In 1966 she decided to study composition in the evening, a task she completed in 1971 - as the first woman at the Dresden University - with a Staatsexamen. From 1984 she worked as a freelance composer.

She was socially active in the CDU and the DFD of the GDR. She received numerous awards for her manifold musical and music pedagogical work as well as her social commitment, e.g. the Pestalozzi-Medaille für treue Dienste in bronze in 1964 and in silver in 1973, the needle of honour for composers and scientists in bronze in 1976 and in silver in 1988. In 1982 the Hochschule für Musik Carl Maria von Weber Dresden awarded her their highest distinction, the Carl-Maria-von-Weber-Plakette. In 1993 she was awarded the Albert Schweitzer Medal by the Albert Schweitzer Committee. She dealt intensively with Schweitzer's work and texts.

Bodenstein-Hoyme died in January 2006 in Dresden aged 81. Her grave is located in the municipal cemetery of her native Wurzen.

== Work ==
Hoyme's main field of work was chamber music for strings, winds, piano and the vocal field with song cycles, choral works or cantatas, mainly based on texts by Albert Schweitzer, but also by Goethe, Eichendorff, Storm, Becher, Morgenstern, Eva Strittmatter and Ho Chi Minh. Besides that she also wrote some symphonic works.

- Minneliederspiel
- Frühlingskantate
- Klaviersonatine
- Violinsonatine
- Fuge für 4 Stimmen für Klavier (btw. 1966–1971)
- Fünf Miniaturen für Violine und Bratsche
- Sonatine für Klavier in D (1967)
- Sinfonische Emotion 1969 (after Lion Feuchtwanger, 1969)
- 10 Variationen nach einem vietnamesischen Kinderlied für 2 Violinen und Kontrabaß (1975)
- Zyklus Die kleinen Weisheiten (1977)
- Cantata Il progresso essemplificato for 3 strings and 3 singers, text: A. Schweitzer (1980)
- Impressions after poems by Ho-Chi-Minh for baritone and piano (1981)
- Heitere Ouvertüre, dedicated to her birthplace Wurzen (1983/84)
- Epigram for baritone and piano, text: A. Schweitzer, commissioned by the Dresden Academy of Music (1984)
- Calendar for speaker and piano, text: Sigismund v. Radecki (1987)
- Stage music for Arbusov's Tanja (for the workers' theatre of the Meissen record factory)
- Orchestra suite with symphonic pictures from the Dresden Great Garden
- In Memoriam J.S. Bach and Albert Schweitzer for tenor, 2 violins and violoncello (1985)
- Evening Serenade for voice, flute and guitar (1999)
- Wind quintet (2001)
- Festive music for wind septet

== Literature ==
- Der Rundblick: Aus Kultur und Heimat der Kreise Wurzen, Oschatz und Grimma. 1958, 1975, 1984 editions
- Beate Philipp (ed.): Memoriter: Zum Leben und Schaffen der Komponistin Ruth Bodenstein-Hoyme. Regensburg 1994
- Bedeutende Frauen im Leipziger Land. Special issue of the Heimatblätter des Bornaer Landes, ed. Heimatverein des Bornaer Landes e.V., Borna 2010
