= Robert Rehfeldt =

German artist

- Born: 5 January 1931; Stargard, Pomerania, Germany
- Died: 28 September 1993 (aged 62); Berlin, Germany
- Occupation: Graphic artist
- Spouse: Ruth Wolf-Rehfeldt
- Children: Linda

Robert Rehfeldt (5 January 1931 – 28 September 1993) was a German graphic artist. He is associated, in particular, with the Actionist and Mail art movements.

== Life ==
Robert Rehfeldt was born in Pomerania in Northern Germany. His father died when he was two. He grew up in Pomerania and then in Berlin. He was one of Germany's 2 million war-time child evacuees between 1940 and 1945, being moved to Bad Ischl (west of Linz) because both his birth city, Stargard (an important rail junction) and the German capital were considered to be at risk of serious aerial bombing during the war. In Bad Ischl he lived with foster parents. Towards the end of the war he was recruited into the "Mountain infantry" Militia (Volkssturm) from which by the end of hostilities he had deserted. After the war, however, in 1946 he was returned to Berlin and, now aged 15, reunited with his mother.

In Berlin he took work as a stonemason and as a transport worker. He applied to study at the recently founded Arts academy in Berlin-Weissensee but his application was rejected. In 1948 Rehfeldt therefore enrolled at the University of the Arts in the western sector of Berlin. He graduated in 1953 after which he worked as a graphic artist, press illustrator and picture-journalist, and increasingly as a freelance artist. During the 1950s he was a member of a group of experimental artists that also included Ingo Kirchner, Hanfried Schulz and Dieter Tucholke. Ten years after graduating he was living in the eastern part of the city and freelancing. However, membership of the East German Visual Artists' League (VBK / Verband Bildender Künstler der DDR) was also necessary in order to be able to access studio space and to be registered as a tax payer: The VBK also enabled him to receive work contracts from government bodies and agencies, notably in connection with state policy in respect of building/construction related art. In practice artists such as Rehfeldt operated during these years in an uneasy alliance of low-level mutual antagonism and exploitation with the state authorities somewhere near the frontiers of legality in ways which usually worked for both sides. It was not common for the authorities to blackmail artists: on one occasion Rehfeldt found various public-sector contracts cancelled after he had produced a set of post cards carrying the subversive message, "Sei Kunst in Getriebe" ("Let art set the agenda"). From 1961 he was involved in the periodic organisation of illicit exhibitions by his wide circle of friends and contacts in East Germany's world of experimental arts.

Appointment of Erich Honecker as head of state in 1971 was followed by a period of cultural liberalisation in the German Democratic Republic, and Rehfeldt, already an inveterate networker domestically, came into contact with the international Mail art movements through his association with Klaus Groh. He quickly succeeded in building up an international network across East and West Europe that also took in the United States and Latin America, becoming n the process a contact point for members of the East German artistic community interested in finding what was going on in the wider world. In addition he entered into correspondence based relationships with Nam June Paik, Wolf Vostell, Robert Filliou, Horst Tress and Dick Higgins. In a country where approximately 90,000 items of mail were intercepted and inspected each day correspondence, especially overseas correspondence, involved a three-way relationship rather than a two way one. There was an occasion when Leo Duch asked Rehfeldt not to include propaganda material in his correspondence after Duch had encountered "difficulties" with the Brazilian authorities over the image of an East German flag accompanying a letter: it then transpired that whoever it was that had placed the flag image in the envelope, it had not been Rehfeldt. Rehfeldt also experimented with creating rubber stamps that marked envelopes with long official sounding company names: he hoped these might have a usefully intimidating effect on the state postal staff.

In 1975 Robert Rehfeldt invited artists from all round the world to create a postcard, and from the cards her received he initiated the first Mail art exhibition in the German Democratic Republic. In 1978 he inspired and supported the Art Exhibition in East Berlin's "Arcade Gallery" and that of 1979 in Jürgen Schweinebraden's alternative "EP Gallery". Later, in 1986, Rehfeldt organised that year's first ever meeting of the "Discrete International Mail-Art Congress".

Rehfeldt produced a large body of graphic artistry and of photography as well as Super 8 format films. In 1991, shortly after reunification, he presented both his own work and a retrospective from his 1975 Mail Art project in a "Retrospective" at Berlin's Ephraim Palace. Two years later, on 28 September 1993, he died shortly after undergoing a medical operation in Berlin. Since then his work has featured posthumously in several major exhibitions. In 2008 the "Parterre Gallery" in Berlin celebrated him with another "Retrospective".
