= Kraft of Meissen =

German bishop of Meissen

Kraft of Meissen (also noted as Krafto, Craft, Crafto, Crato or Christ; died 1066) was a provost of the Collegiate Church of Goslar, who was appointed and consecrated as Bishop of Meissen in 1066 in succession to Bishop Reiner. He died however in the same year before he could enter Meissen and assume his office.

Kraft's sudden death gave rise to a legend, to the effect that he was a very avaricious man who loved his treasure, which he loved to count. One day when he was doing so his servants heard a terrible cry and found him dead alone with a broken neck, which it was said was the work of the devil.

| Preceded by Reiner of Meissen | Bishop of Meissen; 1065–1066 | Succeeded by Saint Benno of Meissen |
