= Wurzen =

Town in Saxony, Germany

- Town
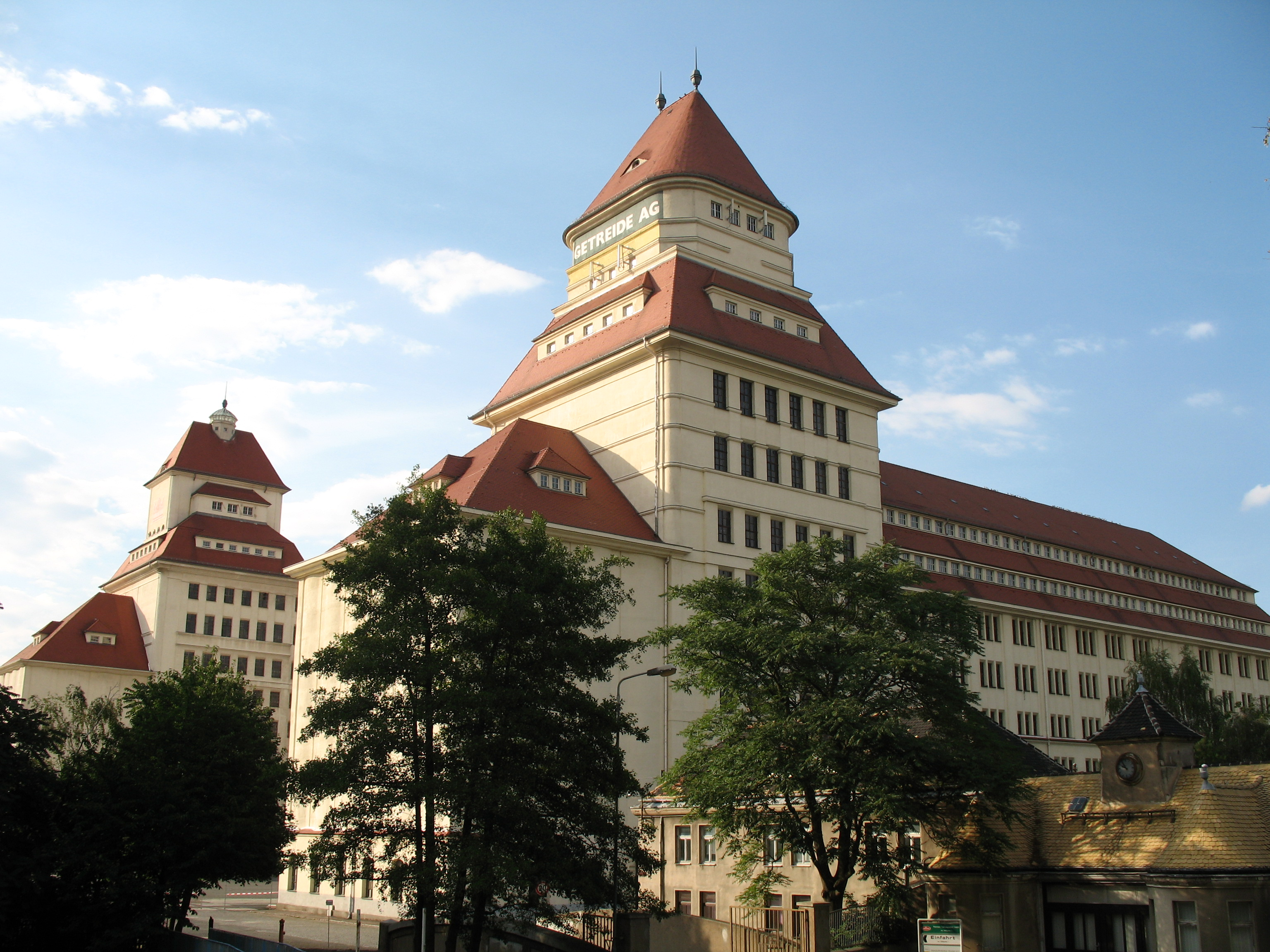
- The mill in Wurzen

- Coat of arms

- Location of Wurzen within Leipzig district
- Interactive map of Wurzen
- Location within Germany Location within Saxony
- Coordinates: 51°22′N 12°43′E
- Country: Germany
- State: Saxony
- District: Leipzig
- Subdivisions: 5

Government
  - Mayor (2022–29): Marcel Buchta (Ind.)

Area
  - Total: 69.04 km^{2} (26.66 sq mi)
- Elevation: 124 m (407 ft)

Population (2025-12-31)
  - Total: 16,159
  - Density: 234.1/km^{2} (606.2/sq mi)
- Time zone: UTC+01:00 (CET)
  - Summer (DST): UTC+02:00 (CEST)
- Postal codes: 04808
- Dialling codes: 03425, 034261
- Vehicle registration: L, BNA, GHA, GRM, MTL, WUR
- Website: www.wurzen.de

Wurzen (German pronunciation: [ˈvʊʁtsn̩]) is a town in the district Leipzig Land (voting) and Muldental (number plates), in Saxony, Germany. It is situated next to the river Mulde, here crossed by two bridges, 25 km east of Leipzig, by rail N.E. of Leipzig on the main line via Riesa to Dresden.

It has a cathedral dating from the twelfth century, a castle, at one time a residence of the bishops of Meissen and later utilized as law courts, several schools, an agricultural college and a police station including a prison.

== History ==
Map of Wurzen (1745)

Founded after 600 by Slavs, Wurzen is first mentioned in the act of donation from Otto I in 961 as a "Burgward" civitas vurcine. Situated in the "anderen Gau Neletici", it was a town early in the twelfth century when Herwig, bishop of Meissen, founded a Collegiate church here. In 1581 it passed to the elector of Saxony. During the Thirty Years' War (1637) it was sacked by the Swedish army and burned almost completely down.

In 1768 Goethe travelled from Leipzig to Dresden and back through Wurzen. The long wait for the ferry later inspired a passage in his first edition of Faust.

On 31 July 1838 Wurzen was connected through Wurzen railway station to the first German long-distance railway (Leipzig–Dresden, opened 7 April 1839). Therefore, the first German railway bridge was constructed to cross the Mulde.

From 1935 to 1945 the city housed a military district command and several anti-aircraft units during the Second World War. From October 1943 to April 1945 Wurzen experienced several US air raids, with over 40 fatalities. The most severe occurred on October 7, 1944, when 13 "Flying Fortresses" B-17 dropped around 85 high-explosive bombs on Wurzen, which were actually intended for the Brüx hydrogenation works in northern Bohemia.

From July 1939 to May 1945, Armin Graebert (1898–1947) was mayor of the city; On April 24, 1945, together with members of the SPD, KPD and the pastors of the Protestant and Catholic churches, he achieved the surrender of the city to Major Victor G. Conley of the 273rd US Infantry Regiment and thus saved it from destruction.

Like in comparable cities of the former GDR, the city saw right-wing influence and right-wing motivated violence in the 1990s. However, there has been an active network of antifascist groups, civil society groups for democracy and church-related groups working against this - also with the support of the city administration.

== Via regia and Central German St. James Way ==
Wurzen is located on the central German route of the St. James pilgrims way to Santiago de Compostela, the so-called Camino de Santiago. It follows the route of the Via Regia, a designated Cultural Route of the Council of Europe.

== International relations ==
Wurzen is twinned with:

- Barsinghausen, Germany
- Warstein, Germany
- Tamási, Hungary

== Economy ==
A main commercial focus is the production of pastries and candies. Furthermore, there are several high-performance medium-sized businesses in mechanical engineering and some specialty companies in town (conveying machinery, lighting design, production of felt).

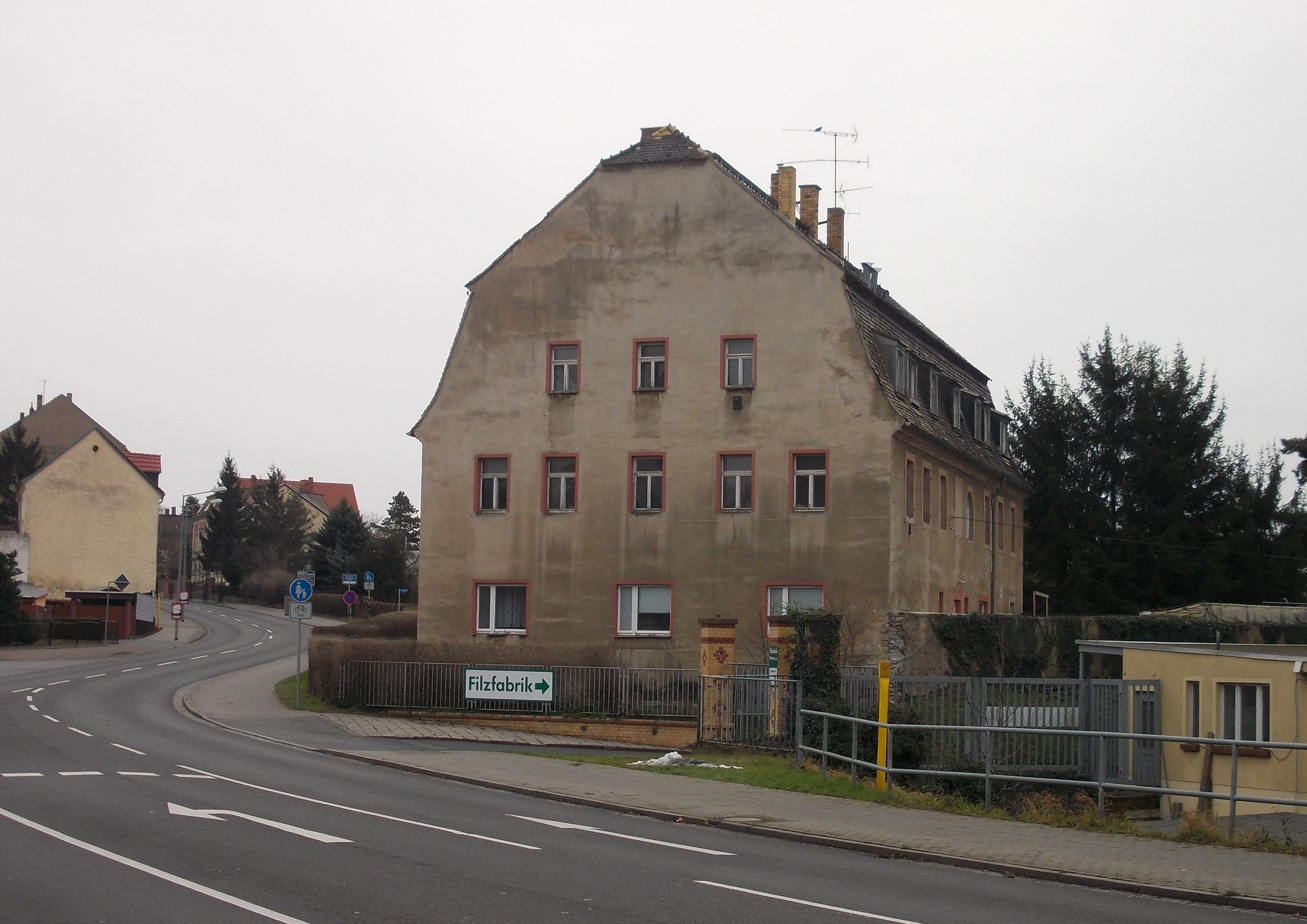
Fabric factory, Crostigall 53

== Transport ==
External: Wurzen is connected to the Leipzig metropolitan area via national highway B6, the closest expressway (Autobahn) connector being situated about 15 km south of Wurzen. There are two airports which can be reached within one hour's driving time, Halle-Leipzig airport and Dresden airport. Wurzen railway station is linked to the central German commuter train network (S-Bahn Mitteldeutschland) and to the regional express train line between Leipzig and Dresden. Wurzen has one bus station with 5 platforms and multiple bus stops being used by lines going to nearby towns and villages such as Grimma and Eilenburg.

Internal: Wurzen has two Town-Bus lines.

== Main sights ==
- Collegiate church St. Marien (Cathedral, consecrated in 1114). Romanesque up to late Gothic architecture (1508). Large ensemble of bronze sculptures by Georg Wrba (1932)
- Lutheran Church St. Wenceslai (16th/17th century)
- Catholic Church Herz-Jesu (consecrated in 1902), in Neo-Romanesque style.
- Castle of Wurzen (from 1497 to 1581 occasionally residence of the Bishop of Dresden-Meissen), an example of late Gothic architecture
- House Lossow (historic-cultural museum with an exhibition of Ringelnatz art). Mannerism/ Baroque (1668)
- Birthplace of the fabulist Magnus Gottfried Lichtwer at Cathedral's Square (17th century)
- Birthplace of Joachim Ringelnatz (17th/18th century).
- Fountain at the marketplace in honour of Joachim Ringelnatz (1983) showing Ringelnatz on a Seahorse.
- Former post-office of the Electorate of Saxony with emblem-adorned gate (1734).
- Postal column (miles distance column) (1724) (re-erected in 1984).
- Classicist City hall (after a fire 1803). Today library and gallery of the town.
- Former (royal) Gymnasium (1883) with mural paintings by Max Seliger.
- Memorial for the dead soldiers of World War I in the former old cemetery (bronze sculpture by Georg Wrba 1930).
- Pesthäuschen, memorial for the victims of the Bubonic plague 1607 (17th century) in the former old cemetery.
- Memorial for the victims of Fascism and the dead of the long march (1945) in the new cemetery.
- Memorial place for the soldiers of the Red Army and Albert Kuntz in the municipal park (1974).
- Commemorative plaque for the victims of Stalinism in the castle courtyard (2005).
- Millennial stone (Badergraben) (2000).
- Cityscape dominating buildings of the mill (Mühlgraben) (1917–1925).
- Former North-station of the "Muldentalbahn" (1875), today Magistrates' Court.
- Water tower of the former municipal waterworks (1893).
- Imperial post office with telegraph station tower (1890/91).
- Bismarck tower on the Wachtelberg hill (Dehnitz, 1911).

== Notable residents ==
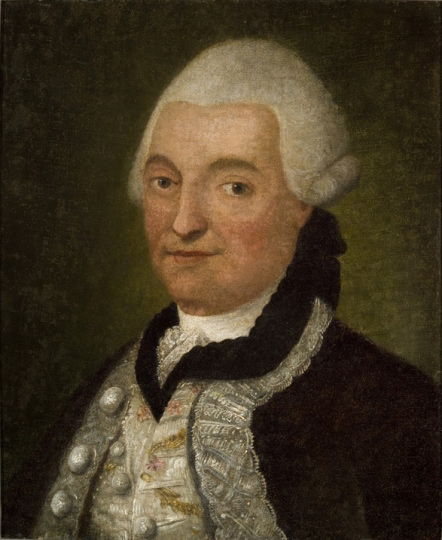
Magnus Gottfreid Lichtwer

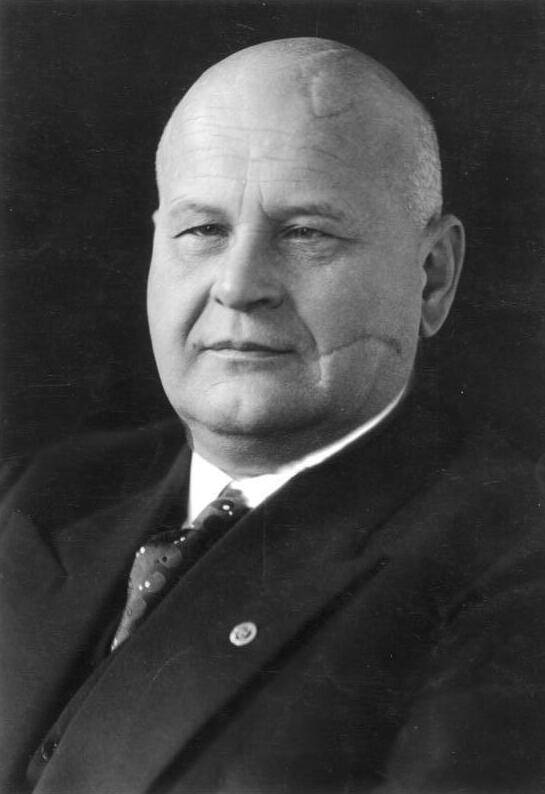
Otto Georg Thierack

- Max Baumbach (1859–1915), sculptor in Berlin
- Johann Gottlob Böhme (1717–1780), historian of the Enlightenment, Goethe's teacher at the University of Leipzig
- Ruth Bodenstein-Hoyme (1924–2006), composer
- Kristina Dörfer (born 1984), singer and actress
- Wilhelm Fischer (1796–1884), Saxon mining official
- Fritz Geißler(1921–1984), composer, most famous symphony musician of the GDR
- Herwig (died 1119), Bishop of Dresden-Meissen, founder of the Collegiate church in Wurzen
- Hans-Ludwig Hirsch (born 1950), graduate chemist;
- Hermann Ilgen (1856–1940), pharmacist, entrepreneur, sports and art patron, honorary citizen of Wurzen from 1929
- Ekkehart Jesse (born 1948), historian and sociologist, researcher of Extremism
- Detlef Kästner, boxer, bronze medallist Olympic Games Boxing at the 1980 Summer Olympics
- Karl Ludwig Langbein (1811–1873), jurist and Member of Frankfurt Parliament
- Magnus Gottfried Lichtwer (1719–1783), jurist and one of the most important German fabulists
- Nadja Michael (* 1969), German opera song and oratorio singer
- Julian Riedel, (born 1990), German TV host
- Joachim Ringelnatz (1883–1934), author and painter (The city styles itself 'Ringelnatz City' in its official advertisements and website as a tribute to him.)
- Paul Röber, (1587–1651), Lutheran theologian
- Johann Christian Schöttgen (1687–1751), Hebraist, historian and educator, rector of the Kreuzschule in Dresden
- Abraham Teller (1609–1658), theologian, songwriter of Hymns, rector of Thomasschule zu Leipzig
- Otto Georg Thierack (1889–1946), 1936 to 1942 President of the People's Court (German) and last Minister of Justice in the Third Reich
- Ralf Thomas (born 1932), evangelical theologian, historian and municipal politician
- Theodor Uhlig, musician (1822–1853), songwriter, composer
- Siegfried H. Horn, archaeologist (1908–1993)
- Manfred Walter (born 1937), football player (national team GDR)
- Philipp Wende (born 1985), rower, Gold medal winner at the Summer Olympic Games
- Ruth Wolf-Rehfeldt (born 1932), mail artist and visual poet

== Persons with relation to Wurzen ==
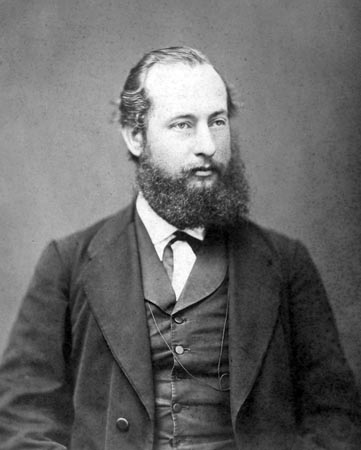
Wilhelm Hasenclever

- John IX of Haugwitz (1524–1595); Last Catholic bishop of Meissen
- Anna Katharina Schönkopf (1746–1810); Youth friend of Goethe in Leipzig
- Wilhelm Hasenclever (1837–1889); Social Democratic publicist and politician; Lived in Wurzen
- Georg Wrba (1872–1939); sculptor
