= Ernst Gotthelf Gersdorf =

German librarian

Ernst Gotthelf Gersdorff (also known as Ernst Gotthelf von Gersdorff or Karl Gotthelf) (2 November 1804 – 5 January 1874) was a German librarian, most notable for his work at the Leipzig University Library. He wrote under the pseudonym Woldemar Egg.

== Life ==
Gersdorf was born in Tautendorf, the son of a clergyman. In 1820 he began his studies in Theology and Philosophy. By 1826 he was working at the Saxon State Library in Dresden.

He died in Leipzig.

== Works ==
- Bibliotheca Patrum ecclesiasticorum Latinorum selecta. Leipzig 1838–1847.
- Clemens <Papa, I.>: Recognitiones. Lipsiae 1838. 254 S.
- Repertorium der gesammten deutschen Literatur. Leipzig Bd. 1 (1834) - Bd. 34 (1842).
- Fortsetzung: Leipziger Repertorium der deutschen und ausländischen Literatur. Leipzig Bd. 1 (1843) - Bd. 72 (1860).
- Chronicon terrae Misnensis seu Buchense. Leipzig 1839. 33 S.
- Zur Territorialgeschichte des Herzogthums Sachsen-Altenburg. Leipzig 1854. 47 S.
- Stadtbuch von Leipzig vom Jahre 1359. Leipzig 1856.
- Die Urkundensammlung der Deutschen Gesellschaft. Leipzig 1856.
- Urkundenbuch des Hochstifts Meissen, in: Codex diplomaticus Saxoniae regiae. Leipzig 1864- 67.
- Beitrag zur Geschichte der Universität Leipzig. Leipzig 1869. 141 S.
- Urkundenbuch der Stadt Meissen und ihrer Klöster. Leipzig 1873. 455 S.
- Codex diplomaticus Saxoniae regiae. Leipzig 1882 -.
