= Humfrid (archbishop of Magdeburg) =

Humfrid or Hunfrid (Note: Modern German: Humfried or Hunfried; modern English: Humphrey) (died 28 February 1051) was the archbishop of Magdeburg from 1023 until his death. He was with the court of the Emperor Henry III when, in the summer or 1040 the newly rebuilt church of Hersfeld was reconsecrated.

== Sources ==
- Bernhardt, John W. Itinerant Kingship and Royal Monasteries in Early Medieval Germany, c. 936–1075. Cambridge: Cambridge University Press, 1993.

Humfrid Born: unknown Died: 28 February 1051
Catholic Church titles
Preceded by Gero	Archbishop of Magdeburg; 1023–1051	Succeeded by Engelhard
