= Archdiocese of Berlin =

Catholic archdiocese in Germany

Coordinates: 52.5158°N 13.3947°E

Archdiocese of Berlin Archidioecesis Berolinensis Erzbistum Berlin

Catholic
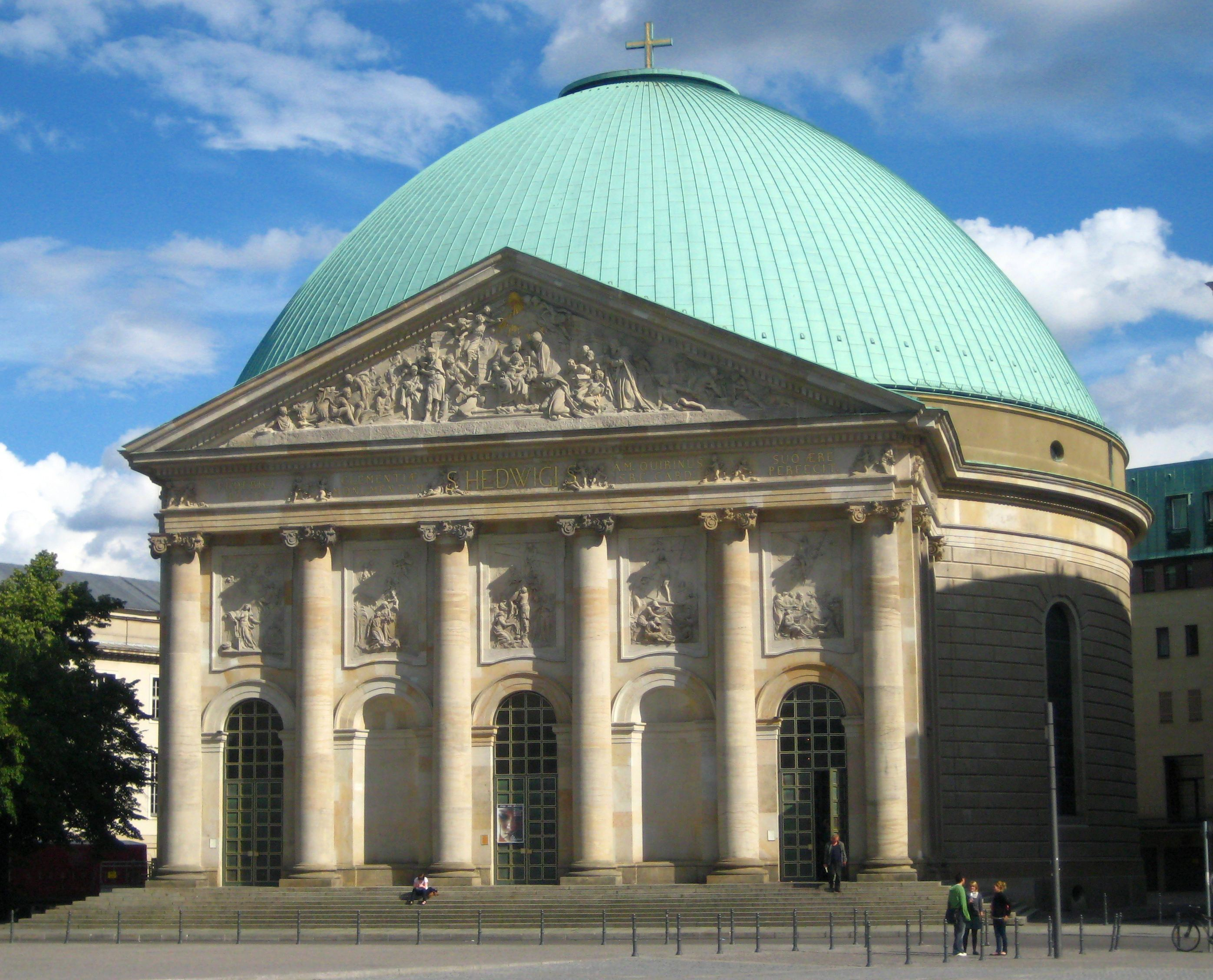
- St. Hedwig's Cathedral

- Coat of arms

Location
- Country: Germany
- Ecclesiastical province: Berlin

Statistics
- Area: 28,962 km^{2} (11,182 sq mi)
- Population: Total; Catholics: (as of 2020); 6,028,542; 411,600 (6.8%)
- Parishes: 99

Information
- Denomination: Catholic
- Sui iuris church: Latin Church
- Rite: Roman Rite
- Established: 13 August 1930
- Cathedral: St. Hedwig's Cathedral
- Patron saint: St. Hedwig of Andechs; St. Otto of Bamberg; St. Peter the Apostle

Current leadership
- Pope: Leo XIV
- Archbishop: Archbishop Heiner Koch
- Auxiliary Bishops: Matthias Heinrich
- Vicar General: Thomas Przytarski

Map
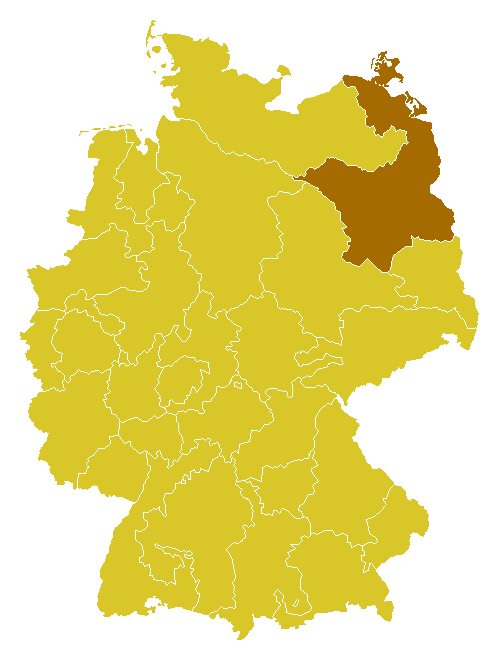

Website
- erzbistumberlin.de

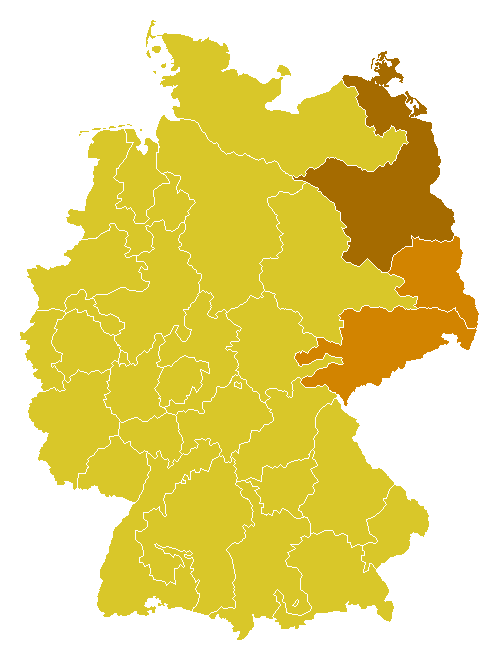
Ecclesiastical province of Berlin

The Archdiocese of Berlin (Latin: Archidioecesis Berolinensis) is a Latin Church ecclesiastical territory or archdiocese of the Catholic Church in Germany. The archepiscopal see is in Berlin, with the archdiocese's territory extending over Northeast Germany.

As of 2004, the archdiocese has 386,279 Catholics out of the population of Berlin, most of Brandenburg (except for its southeastern corner, historical Lower Lusatia) and Hither Pomerania, i. e. the German part of Pomerania. This means that a little over 6% of the population in this area is Roman Catholic. There are 122 parishes in the archdiocese.

The current archbishop is Heiner Koch, formerly Bishop of Dresden, who was appointed by Pope Francis on Monday, 8 June 2015, to replace Rainer Maria Cardinal Woelki, who had earlier been named Archbishop of Cologne.

== History ==
The affairs of the Roman Catholic Church in the Kingdom of Prussia had been reorganised by the Bull "De salute animarum", issued in 1821. Before the Prussian Provinces of Brandenburg and of Pomerania were part of the Vicariate Apostolic of the Northern Missions after the Reformation in the Duchy of Pomerania in 1534 and in the Electorate of Brandenburg in 1539 and the conversion of the majority of the inhabitants had made the area a Catholic diaspora.

Before the Reformation the westernmost territories of the Berlin diocese were in ecclesiastical respect part of the Diocese of Havelberg, the southwestern and central parts belonged to the Diocese of Brandenburg. The northwestern Rügen island belonged to the Diocese of Roskilde, whereas the northern (Hither Pomerania) and the former northeastern part (Farther Pomerania) on both banks of the Oder formed the exempt Diocese of Cammin, established in 1140 for the territory of the then Duchy of Pomerania. Pomerania had repeatedly been Polish or independent before joining the Holy Roman Empire in 1180. Gniezno and Magdeburg archdioceses competed for expanding their influence into Pomerania, which is why the Holy See determined Cammin to remain exempt. Cammin had had a short-lived predecessor, the diocese of Kołobrzeg, established in the year 1000. Kołobrzeg's diocese under Bishop Reinbern was overrun by a pagan revolt just a few years after its establishment and Christianity was reintroduced in the area only in the early 12th century, following military expeditions of Duke Bolesław Wrymouth who once again had tied the Pomeranian lands to Poland. The native Wartislaw I, Duke of Pomerania established the Duchy of Pomerania in 1121, as a vassal state of Poland under Bolesław Wrymouth. Wartislaw I agreed to Christianise Pomerania, and he, along with Bolesław, backed Otto of Bamberg in his successful Conversion of Pomerania.

In 1125 Bolesław Wrymouth established the new Diocese of Lubusz (Lebus) seated in Lubusz (Lebus), with its diocesan territory comprising the Lubusz Land (Land of Lebus), then part of the Polish reign, on both banks of the Oder. Lebus' diocesan area later formed the southeastern part of the Berlin diocese.

In the late 16th and the 17th centuries the competent dioceses of Brandenburg, Cammin, Havelberg, Lebus, and Roskilde had been secularised, the few Catholics in the area were pastored by the Apostolic Vicariate of the Northern Missions (for the dioceses of Brandenburg, Havelberg and Lebus since 1670; for those of Cammin and Roskilde as of 1688). The Holy See considered the former sees as sedes impeditae. In memory of them, Berlin's archdiocesan coat-of-arms combines the symbols of the dioceses of Brandenburg, Cammin, Havelberg and Lebus. With the annexation of most of Silesia until 1763 the bulk of the then Diocese of Breslau (Wrocław), most of which lay within the borders of Kingdom of Bohemia since the 14th century, had become a part of Brandenburg-Prussia. With the dissolution of the Holy Roman Empire Brandenburg was officially merged with Prussia, which itself had gained sovereignty from Poland in 1657 (Treaty of Wehlau).

Many Roman Catholic dioceses and other jurisdictions had borders deviating from the political boundaries often changing with the many wars in Central Europe. This led to the situation where parts of one diocese or jurisdiction lay in different countries. The territory of pre-1815 Brandenburg (thus without Lower Lusatia) and Prussian Pomerania formed part of the Apostolic Vicariate of the Northern Missions, which in 1821 also comprised seventeen other nations partially or completely. In Brandenburg and Pomerania the pope, by the Bull "De salute animarum", established a new jurisdiction on the one hand and extended the ambit of the neighbouring Breslau diocese on the other. The 1815-annexed Prussian part of the Lusatias, in ecclesiastical respect part of the Apostolic Prefecture of the two Lusatias (a.k.a. of Meissen), seated in Bautzen (Saxony), was reassigned in ecclesiastical respect to the Diocese of Breslau, which itself, comprising territory in Bohemia and Prussia, became exempt in 1821 (previously a suffragan of Gniezno). In political respect, the two Lusatias were divided. Lower Lusatia became Brandenburgian, northeastern Upper Lusatia Silesian, southeastern Upper Lusatia remained Saxon. The new jurisdiction was Breslau's Prince-Episcopal Delegation for Brandenburg and Pomerania whose ambit was disentangled from the Northern Missions Apostolic Vicariate and comprised pre-1815 Brandenburg (thus without Lower Lusatia) and Prussian Pomerania. The Bull also reassigned the deaneries of Pszczyna (Pless) and Bytom (Beuthen) from the diocese of Kraków to that of Breslau more than 600 years after those territories had been ceded by the Polish duke Casimir the Just of Kraków to his nephew Mieszko IV Tanglefoot of Racibórz.

=== Breslau's Prince-Episcopal Delegation for Brandenburg and Pomerania ===
By the Bull "De salute animarum" the other parts of Brandenburg and the Province of Pomerania, except for the districts of Bütow (Bytów) and Lauenburg in Pomerania (Lębork) (till 1922 both part of the Diocese of Culm), were subordinated to Breslau's jurisdiction as an episcopal delegation in 1821, ending the mandate of the Vicariate Apostolic there. The jurisdiction was titled the Prince-Episcopal Delegation for Brandenburg and Pomerania (German: Fürstbischöfliche Delegatur für Brandenburg und Pommern), since Emanuel von Schimonsky was invested to Breslau's see as prince-bishop in 1824.

In 1821 the Delegation district comprised altogether six established Catholic parishes:.

- Berlin: St. Hedwig parish, established in 1745, first Roman Catholic Mass in 1719,
- Frankfurt upon Oder: Holy Cross parish, established in 1789, first Roman Catholic Mass in 1786,
- Potsdam: Ss. Peter and Paul parish, established in 1789, first Roman Catholic Mass in the same year,
- Spandau: Ss. Peter and Paul parish on Gewehrplan, Haselhorst, established in 1723, first Roman Catholic Mass in 1722,
- Stettin: St. John the Baptist parish, established in 1722, first Roman Catholic Mass in 1717, and
- Stralsund: Holy Trinity parish, established in 1784, first Roman Catholic Mass in 1761.

Breslau's Prince-Bishop Heinrich Förster (1853–1881) gave generous aid to the founding of churches, monastic institutions, and schools, especially in the diaspora regions. The strife that arose between the Catholic Church and the Prussian State brought his labours in the Prussian part of his diocese to an end. He was deposed by the State and had to leave for the episcopal Austrian Silesian castle of Johannesberg in Jauernig, where he died on 20 October 1881.

So Pope Leo XIII appointed as his successor Robert Herzog (1882–86), till then Prince-Episcopal Delegate for Brandenburg and Pomerania and provost of St. Hedwig's Church in Berlin. Prince-Bishop Herzog made every endeavour to bring order out of the confusion into which the quarrel with the State during the immediately preceding years had thrown the affairs of the diocese.

=== Establishment of the Berlin Diocese ===
According to the Prussian Concordat of 1929 Pope Pius XI elevated the Prince-Episcopal Delegation for Brandenburg and Pomerania to the Diocese of Berlin on 13 August 1930, becoming a suffragan of the Diocese of Breslau simultaneously elevated to archdiocese, whose Eastern German Ecclesiastical Province further comprised the prior exempt Diocese of Ermland and the new Territorial Prelature of Schneidemühl (German: Prälatur Schneidemühl).

In 1930 the Berlin diocese comprised an area of 60,258 km^{2} with 531,744 Catholics, making up 7.3% of the total population. They were pastorally served by 262 diocesan priests within 149 parishes and chapels of ease.

After World War II Berlin's diocesan territory east of the Oder-Neiße line (East Brandenburg and central and Farther Pomerania) – with 33 parishes and chapels of ease – came under Polish control. Most of the parishioners and priests there had either fled the invading Soviet Red Army or were subsequently expelled by Polish authorities.

Cardinal August Hlond demanded the diocesan territory east of the new border for the creation of new dioceses, he appointed a diocesan administrator for Berlin's eastern diocesan territory seated in Gorzów Wielkopolski (Landsberg an der Warthe). Pope Pius XII refused to acknowledge these claims. In 1951, when the Holy See – similar to West Germany – still asserted that East Brandenburg and Farther Pomerania would be returned to Germany at a near date, the Pope appointed Teodor Bensch (1903–1958), titular bishop of Tabuda, as auxiliary bishop responsible for the Polish part of the diocese of Berlin. His office was titled Apostolic Administration of Kamień, Lubusz and the Prelature of Piła (Polish: Administracja Apostolska Kamieńska, Lubuska i Prałatury Pilskiej).

On 27 June 1972, however, – in response to West Germany's change in Ostpolitik and the Treaty of Warsaw – Pope Paul VI reversed the diocesan boundary along the post-war borders. The Apostolic constitution Vratislaviensis - Berolinensis et aliarium disentangled the East Brandenburgian diocesan area (becoming thus the Diocese of Gorzów) and the Farther Pomeranian diocesan area (becoming the new westerly Diocese of Szczecin-Kamień and the easterly Diocese of Koszalin-Kołobrzeg).

=== Modern and contemporary history of the Archdiocese ===
In 1972 the German part of the Archdiocese of Breslau was also reconstituted as the exempt Apostolic Administration of Görlitz, thus giving Berlin exempt status. On 27 June 1994, Pope John Paul II elevated Berlin to the rank of an archdiocese, supervising since the simultaneously erected Diocese of Görlitz (formerly Apostolic Administration) and the prior exempt Diocese of Dresden-Meißen.

In 2011, Pope Benedict XVI named Rainer Maria Woelki as Archbishop of Berlin and made him a cardinal shortly afterward. In 2012, the Archdiocese announced major structural revisions, merging parishes into larger clusters known as "pastoral areas". In August 2020, on the occasion of the 90th anniversary of its existence, the Archdiocese consecrated itself to the Sacred Hearts of Jesus and Mary.

== Ordinaries ==
- Christian Schreiber (13 August 1930 appointed – 1 September 1933 died)
- Nikolaus Bares (27 October 1933 appointed – 1 March 1935 died)
- Konrad Cardinal von Preysing Lichtenegg-Moos (5 July 1935 appointed – 21 December 1950 died)
- Wilhelm Weskamm (4 June 1951 appointed – 21 August 1956 died)
- Julius August Cardinal Döpfner (15 January 1957 appointed – 3 July 1961 appointed Archbishop of Munich and Freising)
- Alfred Cardinal Bengsch (16 August 1961 appointed (later had the personal title of Archbishop) – 13 December 1979 died)
- Joachim Cardinal Meisner (22 April 1980 appointed – 20 December 1988 appointed Archbishop of Cologne)
- Georg Cardinal Sterzinsky (28 May 1989 appointed – 24 February 2011 retired)
- Rainer Maria Cardinal Woelki (2 July 2011 – 20 September 2014 installed Archbishop of Cologne)
- Heiner Koch (appointed 8 June 2015, installed on 19 September 2015)

== Prince-Episcopal Delegates for Brandenburg and Pomerania ==
The delegate was combined in personal union with the provostry of St. Hedwig's in Berlin.

- 1821–1823 – Johann Ambros(ius) Taube (Silesia, *1778 – 22 April 1823*, Berlin), provost of St. Hedwig since 1810
- 1824–1826 – Hubert Auer (Bingen, *1 May 1780 – 17 February 1838*, Trier)
- 1827–1829 – Nikolaus Fischer as administrator per pro
- 1829–1836 – Nikolaus Fischer (*1791– 18 April 1858*, Frankenstein in Schlesien)
- 1836–1849 – Georg Anton Brinkmann (Billerbeck, *15 October 1796 – 7 May 1856*, Münster in Westphalia)
- 1849–1850 – Wilhelm Emmanuel Freiherr von Ketteler
- 1850–1859 – Leopold Pelldram (Schweidnitz, *3 May 1811 – 3 May 1867*, Trier)
- 1860–1870 – Franz Xaver Karker
- 1870–1882 – Robert Herzog (Schönwalde bei Frankenstein, * 17 February 1823 – 26 December 1886*, Breslau)
- 1882–1888 – Johannes Baptist Maria Assmann (Branitz, *26 August 1833 – 27 May 1903*, Ahrweiler)
- 1889–1897 – Joseph Jahnel (*1834–1897*, Berlin)
- 1887–1905 – Karl Neuber (*1841–1905*)
- 1905–1920 – Carl Kleineidam (Hohengiersdorf, *1848–1924*, Giersdorf)
- 1920–1929 – Josef Deitmer (Münster in Westphalia, *12 August 1865 – 16 January 1929*, Berlin)
- 1929–1930 – Christian Schreiber, Bishop of Meissen, as administrator of the future diocese of Berlin

== Notable people ==
- Joseph Ahrens
- Eva-Maria Buch
- Alfred Delp
- August Froehlich, priest murdered by Nazis in the Dachau concentration camp
- Romano Guardini
- Paul Lejeune-Jung
- Bernhard Lichtenberg, priest and anti-nazi activist, awarded the title Righteous Among the Nations
- Josef Lenzel, priest murdered by Nazis in the Dachau concentration camp
- Michael Graf von Matuschka
- Max Josef Metzger
- Margarete Sommer, awarded the title Righteous Among the Nations
- Carl Sonnenschein
- Maria Terwiel
- Albert Willimsky, priest murdered by Nazis in the Sachsenhausen concentration camp
- Josef Wirmer
