= Heinrich Brüning =

Chancellor of Germany from 1930 to 1932

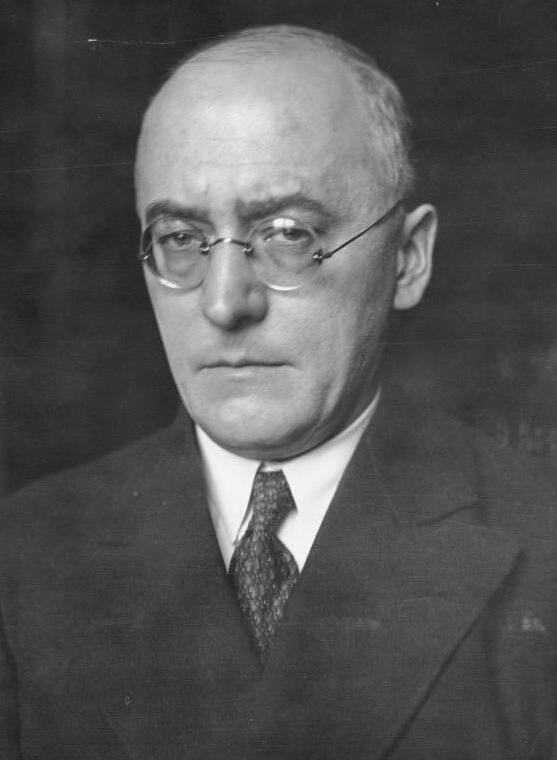
- Brüning c. 1930

Chancellor of Germany (Weimar Republic)
- In office 30 March 1930 – 1 June 1932
- President: Paul von Hindenburg
- Deputy: Hermann Dietrich
- Preceded by: Hermann Müller
- Succeeded by: Franz von Papen

Leader of the Centre Party
- In office 6 May 1933 – 5 July 1933
- Preceded by: Ludwig Kaas
- Succeeded by: Party abolished

Minister of Foreign Affairs
- In office 9 October 1931 – 1 June 1932
- Chancellor: Himself
- Preceded by: Julius Curtius
- Succeeded by: Konstantin von Neurath

Minister of Finance
- Acting; 20 June 1930 – 26 June 1930
- Chancellor: Himself
- Preceded by: Paul Moldenhauer
- Succeeded by: Hermann Dietrich

Member of the Reichstag
- In office 27 May 1924 – 12 December 1933
- Constituency: Breslau (1924–1932); National list (1932–1933)

Personal details
- Born: Heinrich Aloysius Maria Elisabeth Brüning; 26 November 1885 Münster, Province of Westphalia, Kingdom of Prussia, Germany
- Died: 30 March 1970 (aged 84) Norwich, Vermont, United States
- Resting place: Münster, Germany
- Party: Zentrum
- Education: University of Strasbourg; London School of Economics; University of Bonn
- Occupation: Academician; Economist; Activist

Military service
- Allegiance: German Empire
- Branch/service: Imperial German Army
- Years of service: 1915–1918
- Rank: Lieutenant
- Unit: Infantry Regiment No. 30, "Graf Werder"
- Battles/wars: World War I; Western Front
- Awards: Iron Cross, 1st Class; Iron Cross, 2nd Class

Heinrich Aloysius Maria Elisabeth Brüning (pronounced [ˈhaɪnʁɪç ˈbʁyːnɪŋ]; 26 November 1885 – 30 March 1970) was a German Centre Party politician and academic, who served as the chancellor of Germany during the Weimar Republic from 1930 to 1932. His use of deflation in an attempt to combat the effects of the Great Depression in Germany increased unemployment and poverty and earned him the nickname of the “Hunger Chancellor".

A political scientist and Christian social activist, he entered politics in the 1920s and was elected to the Reichstag in 1924. In 1930, he was appointed interim chancellor, just as the Great Depression took hold. His austerity policies in response were unpopular, with most of the Reichstag opposed, so he governed by emergency decrees issued by President Paul von Hindenburg, overriding the Reichstag. This lasted until May 1932, when his land distribution policy offended Hindenburg, who refused to issue any more decrees. Brüning resigned in response to the refusal.

After Hitler took power, Brüning fled Germany in 1934. He eventually settled in the United States. From 1937 to 1952, he was a professor at Harvard University. He returned to Germany in 1951 to teach at the University of Cologne but again moved to the United States in 1955 and lived out his days in retirement in Vermont.

Brüning remains a controversial figure in Germany's history, as historians debate whether he was the "last bulwark of the Weimar Republic", the "Republic's undertaker", or both. Scholars are divided over how much room for manoeuvre he had during the Depression, in a period of great political instability. While he intended to protect the Republic's government, his policies, notably his use of emergency powers, also contributed to the gradual decline of the Weimar Republic during his chancellorship.

== Early life and education ==
Born in Münster in Westphalia, Brüning lost his father when he was one year old, and thus his elder brother Hermann Joseph played a major part in his upbringing in a devoutly Roman Catholic family. After graduating from Gymnasium Paulinum he first leaned towards the legal profession but then studied philosophy, History, German, and Political Science at Strasbourg, the London School of Economics, and Bonn, where in 1915 he received a doctorate for his thesis on the financial, economic, and legal implications of nationalizing the British railway system. Historian Friedrich Meinecke, one of his professors at Strasbourg, had a major influence on Brüning.

Volunteering for the infantry, he was accepted despite his shortsightedness and physical weakness, and served in World War I from 1915 to 1918. He rose to lieutenant in the Infantry Regiment "Graf Werder", and company commander by the end of the war. He was cited for bravery and awarded both the second and first class Iron Cross. Despite having been elected to a soldiers' council after the armistice of 11 November 1918, Brüning did not approve of the German Revolution of 1918–1919 which ended with the establishment of the Weimar Republic.

== Rise in politics ==
Despite his reluctance to speak about his private life, it is assumed that his war experience and the war's aftermath persuaded him not to pursue his academic career, and he preferred to help former soldiers reintegrate into civilian life by assisting them in finding employment or furthering their education. He collaborated with the social reformer Carl Sonnenschein and worked in the "Secretariat for social student work". After six months, he entered the Prussian welfare department and became a close associate of Adam Stegerwald, the minister. Stegerwald, also the leader of the Christian trade unions, made him chief executive of the unions in 1920, a post Brüning retained until 1930.

As the editor of the union newspaper Der Deutsche (The German), Brüning advocated a "social popular state" and "Christian democracy", based on the ideas of Christian corporatism. In 1923, Brüning was actively involved in organising the passive resistance in the "Ruhrkampf". Brüning joined the Centre Party and in 1924 was elected to the Reichstag, representing Breslau. In the Reichstag, he quickly made a name for himself as a financial expert and managed to push through the so-called Brüning Law, which restricted the workers' share of income taxes to no more than 1.2 billion Reichsmarks.

From 1928 to 1930, Brüning served as a member of the Landtag of Prussia. In 1929, after his election as leader of the Centre Party group in the Reichstag, his party's agreement to the Young Plan was made conditional on a guarantee of tax increases that would ensure a balanced budget. This earned him President Paul von Hindenburg's attention.

== Chancellor of Germany (1930–1932) ==
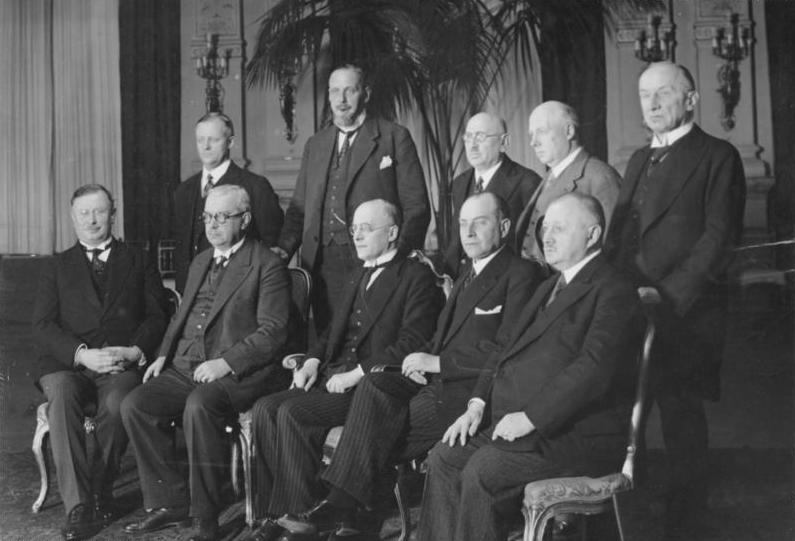
Brüning's first cabinet, March 1930

In March 1930, the grand coalition under the Social Democrat Hermann Müller collapsed. Hindenburg appointed Brüning chancellor on 29 March 1930. Brüning's financial and economic acumen combined with his openness to social questions made him a candidate for chancellor and his war service as a front-line officer made him acceptable to Hindenburg.

=== Great Depression and economic policy ===
The government faced the Great Depression. At the same time, the 1929 Young Plan had greatly reduced war reparations owed by Germany, but paying the remainder required a major increase in monetary inflow. Chancellor Brüning's plan to raise funds was further austerity measures. Brüning disclosed to his associates in the German Labour Federation that his chief aim as chancellor would be to liberate the German economy from the burden of reparations and foreign debt. This would require tight credit and a deflationary rollback of all wage and salary increases (internal devaluation). These policies had begun under the Müller cabinet but would be pursued much more extensively under Brüning.

The Reichstag rejected Brüning's measures within a month. Hindenburg, already bent on reducing the influence of the Reichstag, saw this event as the "failure of parliament", and with Brüning's consent, he called new elections to be held in September. In the meantime, Brüning's measures were implemented in the summer by presidential emergency decrees (Notverordnung) under Article 48 of the Weimar Constitution. The deflationary measures led to a trade surplus, but increased unemployment and poverty. As unemployment continued to rise, Brüning's cuts in both wages and public assistance, combined with rising prices and taxes, increased misery among workers and the unemployed. This gave rise to the slogan "Brüning verordnet Not!" ("Brüning decrees hardship"), alluding to his measures being implemented by the Notverordnung.

Brüning became extremely unpopular. Hindenburg wished to base the government on the parties of the right, but the right-wing German National People's Party (DNVP) refused to support Brüning's government. To the president's dismay, Brüning had to rely on his own Centre Party, the only party that fully supported him, and on the toleration of the Social Democrats.

=== Political crisis and government dissent ===
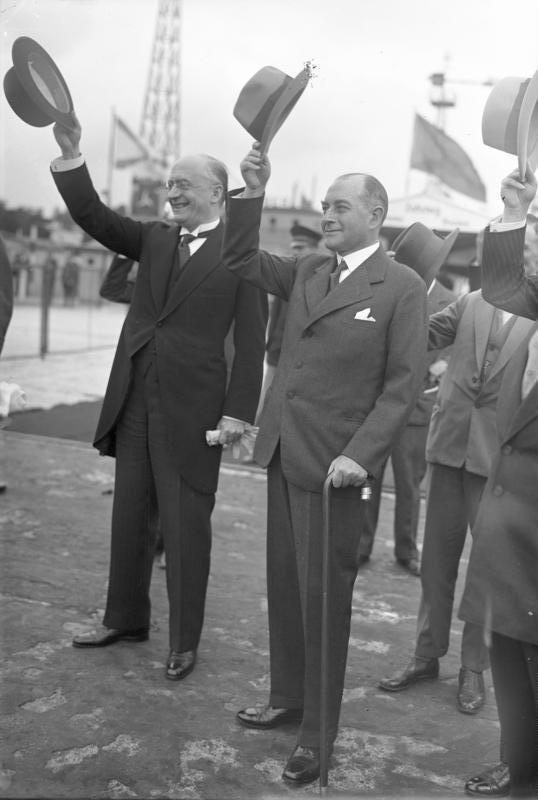
Chancellor Brüning (left) and Foreign Minister Julius Curtius (right) saying good-bye to British Prime Minister Ramsay MacDonald at Berlin Tempelhof Airport, July 1931.

In the September election, the parties of the grand coalition lost many seats, while the Communists and the National Socialists (Nazis) made major gains. This left Brüning without any hope of forming a Reichstag majority. Instead, he continued to govern by Notverordnung. He coined the term "authoritarian democracy" to describe this form of government, based on the cooperation of the president and parliament. Brüning was somewhat ambivalent toward democracy. Soon after taking office, he sharply limited freedom of the press. By one estimate, 100 newspaper editions were banned every month.

Brüning's harsh economic policies undermined the tacit support of the Social Democrats for the government, while the liberal and conservative members of the cabinet favoured opening the government to the right. President Hindenburg, pushed by his camarilla and military chief Kurt von Schleicher, also advocated such a move and insisted on a cabinet reshuffle, especially the removal of ministers Joseph Wirth and Theodor von Guérard, both from the Centre Party.

The president's wishes also hampered the government's resolution in combating the extremist parties and their respective paramilitary organisations. The chancellor and president agreed that the brutality, intolerance, and demagogy of the Communists and Nazis rendered them unfit for government, and Brüning believed the government was strong enough to steer Germany through the crisis without the support of the Nazis.

Nonetheless, he negotiated with Hitler about toleration or a formal coalition, without yielding to the Nazis any position of power or full support by presidential decree. Because of these reservations, the negotiations came to nothing and as street violence rose to new heights in April 1932, Brüning had both the Communist "Rotfrontkämpferbund" and the Nazi Sturmabteilung banned. The unfavourable reaction in right-wing circles further undermined Hindenburg's support for Brüning.

Brüning agonised over how to stem the growing Nazi tide, especially since Hindenburg could not be expected to survive another full term as president should he choose to run again. If Hindenburg were to die in office, Hitler would be a strong favourite to succeed him.

==== Restoring the monarchy ====
In his posthumously published memoirs, Brüning claims, without support of contemporaneous documents, that he hit upon a last-ditch solution to prevent Hitler from taking power: restoring the Hohenzollern monarchy. He planned to persuade the Reichstag to cancel the 1932 German presidential election and extend Hindenburg's term. He would have then had the Reichstag proclaim a monarchy, with Hindenburg as regent. Upon Hindenburg's death, one of Crown Prince Wilhelm's sons would have been invited to assume the throne. The restored monarchy would have been a British-style constitutional monarchy in which real power would have rested with the legislature.

He managed to garner support from all of the major parties except the Nationalists, Communists, and Nazis, making it very unlikely that the plan would get the two-thirds majority required for passage. The plan floundered, however, when Hindenburg, an old-line monarchist, refused to support restoration of the monarchy unless Kaiser Wilhelm II was recalled from exile in the Netherlands. When Brüning tried to impress upon him that neither the Social Democrats nor the international community would accept any return of the deposed Kaiser, Hindenburg threw him out of his office.

=== Foreign policy ===
Despite his policies of economic austerity, Brüning pursued a nationalist-right foreign policy. He wanted to build two battlecruisers for the Reichsmarine, and expanded German influence in central and eastern Europe, signing bilateral trade treaties with the Kingdom of Hungary and the Kingdom of Romania. Brüning tried to alleviate the burden of reparation payments and to achieve German equality in the rearmament question. In 1930, he replied to Aristide Briand's initiative to form a "United States of Europe" by demanding full equality for Germany, refusing offers of French financial assistance to help Germany's deteriorating economy.

Brüning's nationalist foreign policy chilled investment in Germany and hindered his efforts to achieve foreign loans. In 1931 plans for a customs union between Weimar Germany and the First Austrian Republic were shattered by French opposition. Brüning responded by issuing an aggressive communique demanding the nullification of the Treaty of Versailles and announcing a unilateral moratorium on German reparations. The communique led to a financial panic which depleted the Reichsbank's reserves and led to banking crises at Danatbank and Dresdner Bank.

President of the United States Herbert Hoover tried to avert further political and economic crisis by negotiating the Hoover Moratorium, postponing reparations and repayment of inter-Allied debts. France disapproved of the moratorium and delayed ratification long enough to trigger a banking run, which led to the collapse of the Danatbank. The Reichsbank was forced to close the financial system and withdraw the Reichsmark from the gold standard. It also established import controls and nationalised foreign currency holdings. Brüning's actions caused the Bank of England to abandon the gold peg of the pound sterling, which severely worsened the Great Depression. In summer 1932, after Brüning's resignation, his successors reaped the fruits of his policy at the Lausanne conference, which reduced reparations to a final payment of 3 billion marks.

Negotiations over rearmament failed at the 1932 Geneva Conference shortly before his resignation, but in December, the "Five Powers Agreement" accepted Germany's military equality.

=== Hindenburg's re-election and Brüning's fall ===
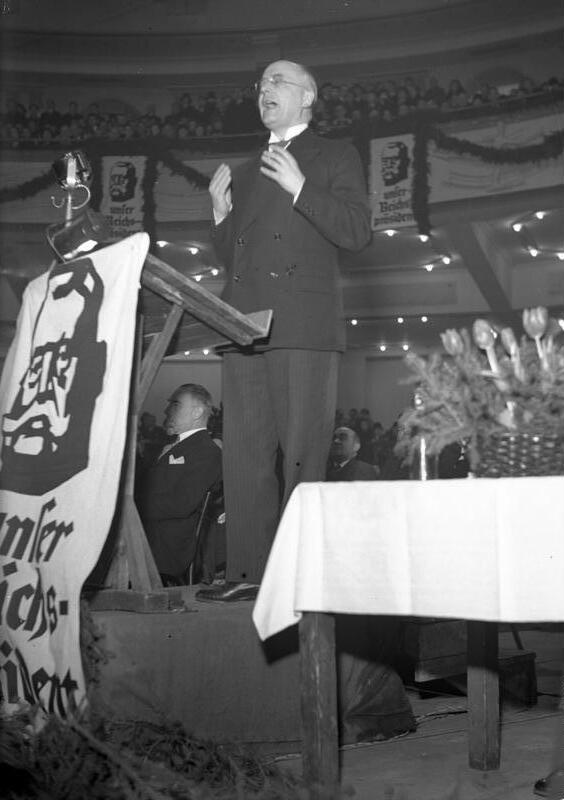
Chancellor Brüning campaigning for Hindenburg's re-election, Berlin Sportpalast, March 1932

Hindenburg was not willing at first to stand for re-election as president, but subsequently changed his mind. In the 1932 presidential election, Brüning vigorously campaigned for Hindenburg along with virtually the entire German left and centre, calling him a "venerated historical personality" and "the keeper of the constitution". After two rounds of voting, Hindenburg was re-elected with a substantial majority over his main opponent, Hitler. However, Hindenburg considered it shameful to have been elected with the votes of "Reds" and "Catholes", as he called Social Democrats and the mostly Catholic Centre Party. He realised he was considered the lesser of two evils by them, and he compensated for this "shame" by moving further to the right. His failing health increased the camarilla's influence.

As Brüning gradually lost Hindenburg's support, the ban of the Nazi SA paramilitary organisation initiated by Minister Wilhelm Groener on 13 April 1932 sharpened the conflict and led to considerable ill-feeling between Hindenburg and his trusted friend Kurt von Schleicher. At the same time, he was viciously attacked by the Prussian Junkers, led by Elard von Oldenburg-Januschau, who opposed Brüning's policies of distributing land to unemployed workers in the course of the Eastern Aid (Osthilfe) programme and denounced him as an "Agro-bolshevik" to Hindenburg.

The president, having a personal conflict of interest as owner of a highly indebted Junker estate, refused to sign any further emergency decrees. As a consequence, Brüning and his cabinet resigned on 30 May 1932, "100 metres before the finish". Brüning was the first Weimar chancellor removed at the request of the president rather than parliament.

== After his resignation ==
After Brüning resigned as chancellor, Centre Party chairman Ludwig Kaas asked Brüning to replace him, but the former chancellor declined and asked Kaas to stay. Brüning supported his party's determined opposition to his successor, Franz von Papen. He also supported re-establishing a working Reichstag by cooperating with the Nazis, negotiating with Gregor Strasser.

After Hitler became chancellor on 30 January 1933, Brüning vigorously campaigned against the new government in the March 1933 elections. Later that month, he vehemently opposed Hitler's Enabling Act, calling it the "most monstrous resolution ever demanded of a parliament." But having received assurances from Hitler that the Centre Party would not be banned, he yielded to party discipline and voted in favour of the bill. With the Communist deputies already banned from the Reichstag, only the Social Democrats voted against the act.

Kaas, a priest, moved to Rome in 1933 to help the Vatican negotiate with Germany. So in May 1933, he resigned as party chairman, and Brüning was elected chairman on 6 May. Hoping to adapt to the post-Enabling Act order, the party adopted a watered-down version of the Führerprinzip; pro-Centre papers now declared that the party's members, or "retinue", would fully submit to Brüning. This only served to buy the party just a few more months of life. Prominent members were frequently arrested and beaten, pro-Centre civil servants were fired, and Nazi officials demanded that the party either dissolve or else it would be banned. Bowing to the inevitable, Brüning dissolved the Centre Party on 5 July.

== Exile and later years ==
In 1934, Brüning was warned by friends of the imminent Night of the Long Knives. On 3 June, 27 days before the purge, he fled Germany via the Netherlands. After staying in Switzerland and the United Kingdom, he went to the United States in 1935. In 1937, he became a visiting professor at Harvard University, and he was the Lucius N. Littauer Professor of Government at Harvard from 1939 to 1952. He became a member of the American Academy of Arts and Sciences in 1938. He warned the American public about Hitler's plans for war, and later about Soviet aggression and plans for expansion, but in both cases, his advice went largely unheeded.

In 1951, he returned to Germany, settling in Cologne in West Germany, where he taught as a professor of political science at the University of Cologne until he retired in 1953. Partly because of his dissatisfaction with Chancellor Konrad Adenauer's policies, he returned to the United States in 1955. There, he revised the manuscript of his Memoirs 1918–1934, which was edited by his longtime assistant, Claire Nix. Due to the memoirs' highly controversial content, they were not published until after his death in 1970. Parts of the memoirs are considered unreliable, not based on historical records, and a self-justification for his politics during the Weimar Republic.

Brüning died 30 March 1970 in Norwich, Vermont, and was buried in his home town of Münster.

== Historic evaluation ==
Debate continues as to whether Brüning's policy of deflation was without alternative. Some argue that the Allies would not in any circumstances have allowed a devaluation of the Reichsmark, while others point to the Hoover Moratorium as a sign that the Allies understood that the situation had changed fundamentally and further German reparation payments were impossible. Brüning expected that the policy of deflation would temporarily worsen the economic situation before it began to improve, quickly increasing the German economy's competitiveness and then restoring its creditworthiness. His long-term view was that deflation would, in any case, be the best way to help the economy. His primary goal was to end Germany's reparations payments by convincing the Allies that they could no longer be paid. Anton Erkelenz, chairman of the German Democratic Party and a contemporary critic of Brüning, famously said that the policy of deflation was:

A rightful attempt to release Germany from the grip of reparation payments, but in reality, it meant nothing else than committing suicide because of fearing death. The deflation policy causes much more damage than the reparation payments of 20 years [...] Fighting against Hitler is fighting against deflation and the enormous destruction of production factors.

In 1933, the American economist Irving Fisher developed the theory of debt deflation. He explained that deflation causes a decline in profits and asset prices, and a still greater decline in the net worth of businesses. Even healthy companies, therefore, may appear over-indebted and facing bankruptcy.

While it is a popular theory that economic performance and democratic government are positively correlated (more resources and workers as a result of industrialisation stimulating economic growth), it is not the sole factor that popularized support for the NSDAP. In her paper, "Civil Society and the Collapse of the Weimar Republic", Sheri Berman states instead that Hitler was able to infiltrate civic groups and grow his base that way, citing the fragmenting characteristics of civil society as a main cause of the NSDAP's rise to power. In these civic societies, groups instilled anti-democratic values in their participants. From there, Hitler was able to infiltrate the groups and use their leaders by working from the inside.

Since the government could not respond to all of the anti-democratic criticisms from the civil society groups, some groups aligned themselves with the populist, which would support them, eventually leading to the alignment with the Nazi party. As David Rieff states, civil society being a uniting force is true to the extent that people will be inherently good in their ideals. By using the heads of the civic committees, Hitler was able to spread his message in the groups and further his agenda without actually campaigning. Due to a "lack of any basic consensus about the past, present and future of the German state and society", civic association groups were sheep waiting to be led by a herder. Therefore, focusing on the contradictions and ambivalences of civil society will provide the real reason for the rise of the NSDAP.

== Bibliography ==
- Brüning, Heinrich (1947). Heywood, Robert B. (ed.). The Works of the Mind: The Statesman. Chicago: University of Chicago Press. OCLC 752682744.
- Bracher, Karl Dietrich (1971), Die Auflösung der Weimarer Republik; Eine Studie zum Problem des Machtverfalls in der Demokratie (in German), Ring-Verlag.
- Eschenburg, Theodor (1972), "The Role of the Personality in the Crisis of the Weimar Republic: Hindenburg, Brüning, Groener, Schleicher", in Holborn, Hajo (ed.), Republic to Reich: The Making of the Nazi Revolution, Pantheon Books, pp. 3–50, ISBN 0-394-47122-9.
- Hamilton, Richard (1982). Who Voted for Hitler?. Princeton University Press. ISBN 0691093954.
- Nekrich, Aleksandr Moiseevich. Pariahs, Partners, Predators: German-Soviet Relations, 1922–1941, Columbia University Press, 1997.
- Patch, William (1998), Heinrich Brüning and The Dissolution of the Weimar Republic, Cambridge University Press, ISBN 0-521-62422-3.
- Wheeler-Bennett, John (2005), The Nemesis of Power: German Army in Politics, 1918–1945 (2nd ed.), Palgrave Macmillan, ISBN 1-4039-1812-0.

Political offices
Preceded by Hermann Müller	Chancellor of Germany; 30 March 1930 – 30 May 1932	Succeeded by Franz von Papen
Preceded by Julius Curtius	Foreign Minister of Germany; 9 October 1931 – 30 May 1932	Succeeded by Konstantin von Neurath
