= Johannes Wübbe =

Johannes Wübbe (born 23 February 1966 in Lengerich) has been the Titular Bishop of Ros Cré (and auxiliary bishop of Osnabrück) since 18 June 2013. In 1970, the Roman Catholic Church revived the title.

Catholic Church titles
Preceded by Heiner Koch	Bishop of Roscrea; 2013–present	Succeeded by Incumbent
