= Manuel Sobreviñas =

Bishop Emeritus of Imus

The Most Reverend Manuel Sobreviñas
- Bishop Emeritus of Imus
- Church: Catholic Church
- Province: Manila
- See: Imus
- Appointed: February 25, 1993
- Installed: April 1, 1993
- Term ended: October 22, 2001
- Predecessor: Félix Paz Pérez
- Successor: Luis Antonio Tagle
- Other post: Titular Bishop of Tulana (1979–2020)
- Previous post: Auxiliary Bishop of Manila (1979–1993)

Orders
- Ordination: March 10, 1951 by Gabriel Reyes
- Consecration: May 25, 1979 by Jaime Sin

Personal details
- Born: Manuel Cruz Sobreviñas; April 7, 1924 Dinalupihan, Bataan, Philippine Islands
- Died: July 18, 2020 (aged 96) San Juan, Metro Manila, Philippines
- Buried: Church of Divine Mercy, Silang, Cavite, Philippines
- Denomination: Roman Catholic
- Education: University of Santo Tomas Central Seminary, España, Sampaloc, Manila; San Carlos Seminary, Makati, Metro Manila
- Motto: Ministrare (To Serve)
- Coat of arms: Manuel Sobreviñas's coat of arms

Ordination history
History
Priestly ordination
- Ordained by: Gabriel Reyes
Episcopal consecration
- Consecrated by: Jaime Sin

Styles of Manuel C. Sobreviñas
- Reference style: His Excellency; The Most Reverend
- Spoken style: Your Excellency
- Religious style: Bishop

Manuel Cruz Sobreviñas (7 April 1924 – 18 July 2020) was a Filipino prelate of the Roman Catholic Church. He served as the third Bishop of Imus from 1993 to 2001.

== Life and Ministry ==
Sobreviñas was born in Dinalupihan, Philippines. He studied at the San Carlos Seminary, as well as at the UST Central Seminary. He was ordained a priest on March 10, 1951, at Villa San Miguel.

Among other assignments, he served as Parish Priest of the now Diocesan Shrine of Our Lady of Aranzazu in San Mateo, Rizal (1962-1975), and San Felipe Neri Parish in Mandaluyong (1975-1979).

Sobreviñas was appointed auxiliary bishop of the Archdiocese of Manila on April 7, 1979, as well as titular bishop of Tulana, and was consecrated on May 25, 1979. Concurrently, he served as parish priest of the Immaculate Conception Parish in Pasig.

On February 25, 1993 he was appointed bishop of the Diocese of Imus and installed on April 1, 1993, replacing Felix Perez, who died in office. He served as bishop until retirement on October 22, 2001.

== Death and interment ==
He died on 18 July 2020 at Cardinal Santos Medical Center from COVID-19. At the time of his death, Sobreviñas was the oldest living Filipino bishop.

His remains were interred at the Himlayang Pastol, located underneath the Church of Divine Mercy in Silang, Cavite.

Catholic Church titles
Preceded by Felix P. Perez	Roman Catholic Bishop of Imus; April 1, 1993—October 22, 2001	Succeeded by Luis Antonio Tagle
