= Bishop of Roscrea =

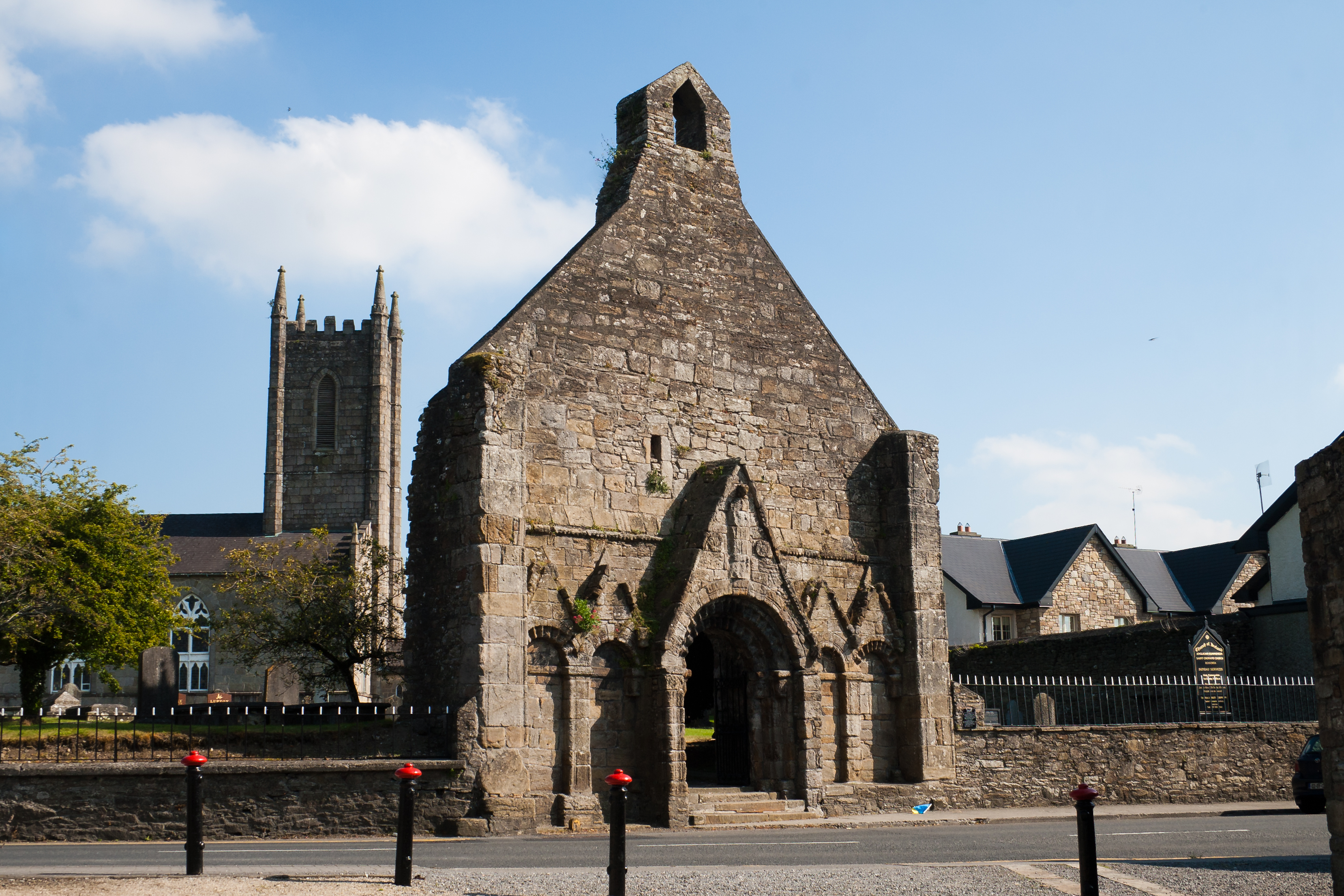
Roscrea, County Tipperary, Ireland

The Bishop of Roscrea (Irish: Easpuig Ros Cré) was an episcopal title which took its name after the town of Roscrea in County Tipperary, Ireland.

Roscrea monastery was founded by Saint Crónán of Roscrea in the 7th century, and from which the modern town grew around it. In March 1152, the diocese of Roscrea was one of the twenty-four dioceses established at the Synod of Kells. There are only two known diocesan bishops of Roscrea: Ísác O Cuanáin who died in 1161 and Ua Cerbaill who died in 1168. By the end of the 12th century, Roscrea had been incorporated into the bishopric of Killaloe.

In 1970, the Roman Catholic Church revived the title as the Titular Bishop of Ros Cré.

== Titular bishops of Ros Cré ==
Bishops of Ros Cré
From	Until	Incumbent	Notes
1970	1971	Dominic Joseph Conway	Appointed titular bishop of Ros Cré and auxiliary bishop of Elphin on 16 October 1970; ordained bishop 8 November 1970; appointed diocesan bishop of Elphin on 12 March or 1 May 1971
1971	1973	Titular see vacant	
1973	1983	Philip James Anthony Kennedy	Appointed titular bishop of Ros Cré and auxiliary bishop of Adelaide on 29 January 1973; ordained bishop 17 March 1973; died 23 March 1983
1983	1991	Patrick Joseph Walsh	Appointed titular bishop of Ros Cré and auxiliary bishop of Down and Connor on 6 April 1983; ordained bishop 15 May 1983; appointed diocesan Bishop of Down and Connor on 18 March 1991
1991	1993	Titular see vacant	
1993	1995	Ramon Cabrera Argüelles	Appointed titular bishop of Ros Cré and auxiliary bishop of Manila on 26 November 1993; ordained bishop 6 January 1994; appointed bishop of the Military Ordinariate of the Philippines 25 August 1995 and later archbishop of Lipa 14 May 2004
1995	2006	Titular see vacant	
2006	2013	Heiner Koch	Appointed titular bishop of Ros Cré and auxiliary bishop of Cologne on 17 March 2006; ordained bishop 7 May 2006. Appointed bishop of Dresden-Meissen on 18 January 2013.
2013	2013	Titular see vacant	
2013	present	Johannes Wübbe	Appointed titular bishop of Ros Cré and auxiliary bishop of Osnabrück on 18 June 2013.
