= Heinrich Förster =

German prince-bishop

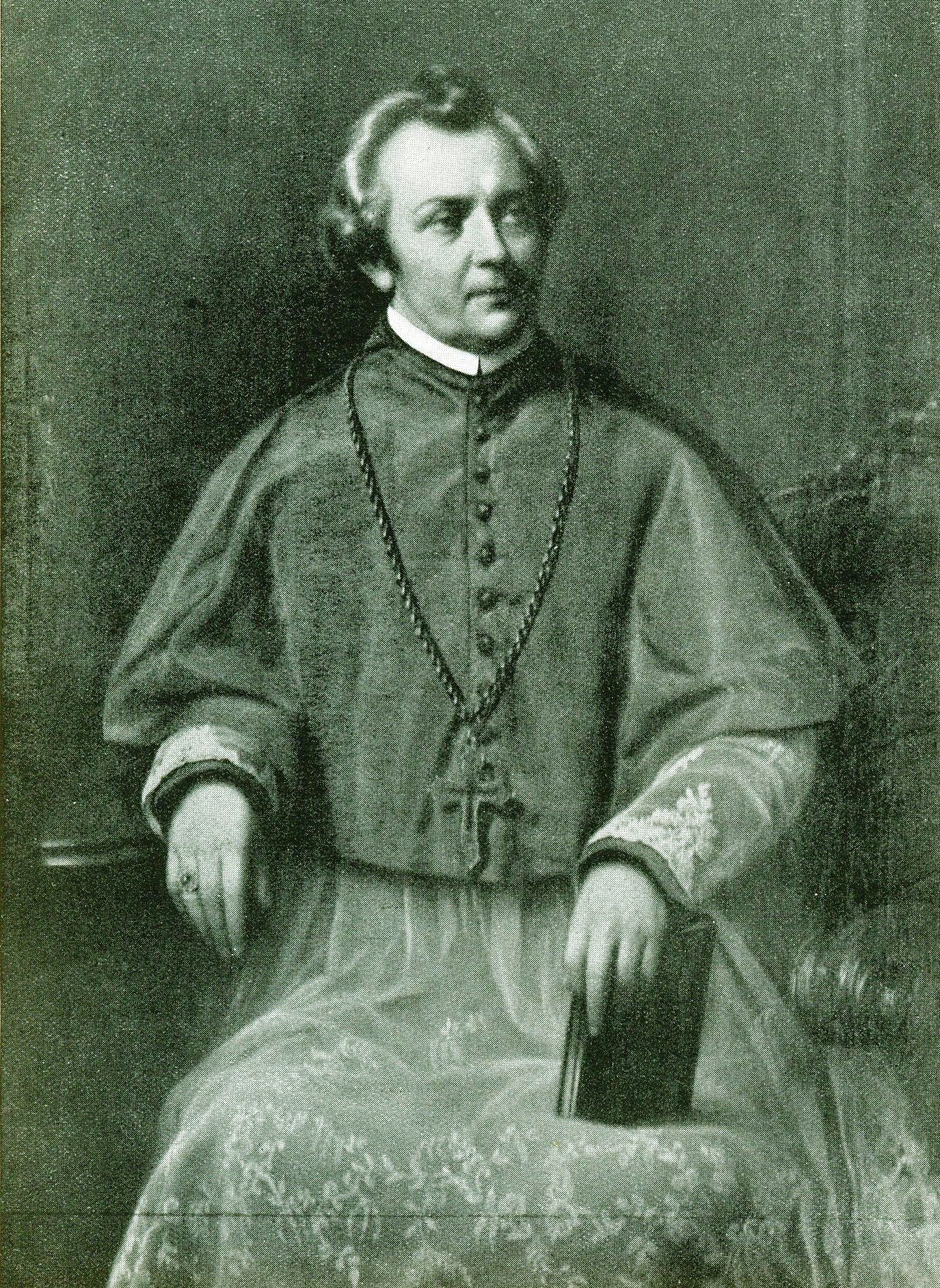

Heinrich Förster (24 November 1799 – 20 October 1881) was a German Roman Catholic bishop who was deposed during the Kulturkampf in Germany.

== Biography ==
He was born at Grossglogau on 24 November 1799, was educated at Breslau, and in 1837 was appointed chief preacher at the Cathedral of Breslau. In 1853 he was elected bishop. At the numerous synods and councils which he attended, he revealed himself as a stanch defender of the orthodox Roman Catholic creed, although he opposed the dogma of papal infallibility at the Council of the Vatican.

In 1875, after repeated conflicts with the Prussian May Laws, a court declared him deposed from his see, a unilateral act without ecclesiastical effect, but de facto executed in the Prussian bulk part of the diocese. Before the sentence Förster had moved to the prince-episcopal summer residence Johannesberg Castle in Jauernig in Silesia in the Bohemian part of the diocese. In that part of the diocese in Bohemian Silesia Förster remained the acting prince-bishop also observing his task as member of the Silesian parliament, which he, as prince-bishop, held ex officio. He died in Jauernig on 20 October 1881. He was a noted pulpit orator.

== Works ==
His principal works are:

- Der Ruf der Kirche in die Gegenwart (4th ed. 1879)
- Die christliche Familie (6th ed. 1893)
- Kardinal Diepenbrock. Ein Lebensbild (3d ed. 1878)
- Gesammelte Kanzelvorträge (5th ed. 1879)

== Notes ==
Catholic Church titles
Preceded by Melchior von Diepenbrock	Prince-Bishop of Breslau; 1853–1881	Succeeded by Robert Herzog
