= Austro-German Customs Union =

Customs union between Germany and Austria

The Austro-German customs union was a project designed by Germany and Austria in 1930 and 1931 and publicly presented on March 31, 1931, which envisaged the elimination of tariffs between the two countries. Ultimately unsuccessful, the plan was justified as part of European economic recovery efforts during the Great Depression, although for the countries that opposed this goal —especially France and Czechoslovakia— it was a first step towards the political union of the two countries, which they strongly opposed. Political and economic pressures —most effective since the bankruptcy of Creditanstalt, Austria's largest bank, in May, which increased Vienna's financial needs— derailed the project, even before the Permanent Court of International Justice ruled against it and declared it incompatible with Austria's international obligations in September.

== Change in German foreign policy ==
Three events marked the change in German foreign policy in the late 1920s and early 1930s: the two conferences at The Hague —held in August 1929 and January 1930— which changed the system for paying war reparations to the victors of World War I and brought forward the French evacuation of the left bank of the Rhine by five years —five years earlier than the Treaty of Versailles— and the death of the influential German foreign minister, Gustav Stresemann, on October 4, 1929. For Stresemann, the union with Austria, although desirable, had not been a priority; more important had been the French withdrawal from the Rhine and the possibility of regaining territory in the east.

In March 1931, with the direction of German foreign policy in the hands of less skilled officials than Stresemann, the world received with surprise the news of the Austro-German plan for a customs union. If Stresemann had concentrated on liquidating the system of war reparations and on achieving the French withdrawal from the Rhine, his successor at the head of the ministry, Julius Curtius —without great experience in foreign policy, less far-sighted than his predecessor and without the latter's skill— decided to accelerate the revision of the consequences of the peace treaties and to strengthen the Reich's relationship with the countries of central and southeastern Europe, especially with Austria.

== Circumstances ==
=== Obstacles to the Anschluss ===
The two peace treaties, the one imposed on Germany and the one initialed by Austria, prevented in principle the absorption of the latter by the former (Anschluss). Article 80 of the Treaty of Versailles obliged Germany to respect Austrian independence; Article 88 of the Treaty of Saint-Germain committed Austria to remain independent and not to take any action that would jeopardize this without the approval of the League of Nations. The opposition of France, Czechoslovakia and Italy to such a possibility made it impossible to obtain this permission and, with it, to consummate the union, desired at that time by the majority of the Austrian and probably also of the German population.

The Geneva protocols signed on October 4, 1922, prevented Austria from entering into any economic or financial negotiations that threatened its independence and from granting privileges to any nation that posed such a threat.

Germany admitted that, according to these treaties, even a temporary customs union required the permission of the signatories to the protocols, and suspected that they would oppose the measure. Austria also understood that the project was forbidden in practice by both the peace treaties and the 1922 protocols. Annexation remained, however, a clear German foreign policy objective —along with the recovery of the Polish "corridor"—, especially after the French evacuation of the Rhine, which had hitherto taken priority over the absorption of Austria. For Austria, the two main reasons for favoring the union were both cultural and economic —it was widely believed that the small republic was not economically viable—.

The economic imbalance also led to differences in the degree of interest in the project: although Germany was Austria's largest trading partner, for the Reich the Alpine republic was only the twelfth destination for its exports and the twentieth in the list of imports. German producers were also not very willing to make sacrifices in favor of increased Austrian imports, nor did Germany have much surplus capital to invest in Austria.

Other factors hindered the Austro-German plan: the growth of the Heimwehr, whose attitude toward union with Germany was ambiguous; the possible Austrian rejection of annexation if Germany proved incapable of improving the Alpine republic's economic situation; and French plans —embodied in Aristide Briand's 1929 proposal for a European union— to maintain the postwar political and territorial order.

=== Circumstances that favored the plan ===
On the other hand, several circumstances favored the implementation of the customs union plan. The Austrian government at that time was headed by Johann Schober, who was considered by the German leadership to be in favor of annexation, unlike his predecessor and a key figure in Austrian politics during the decade, Ignaz Seipel. For Schober, Seipel's rival, union with Germany would have derailed Seipel's plans for a Danubian union. Moreover, the Austrian economic crisis was to the advantage of the supporters of the union, who saw in it a remedy or at least a possible relief of the country's straitened economic situation. The customs union was to enable the Austrians to gain access to the large German market on favorable terms by making it economically part of Germany and, at the same time, to avoid the claims of nations with which both Berlin and Vienna had signed preferential treaties. Union with Germany, both as a solution to national economic problems and as a natural evolution of Austria, was also supported by the socialist opposition.

The German government's conviction that it needed a foreign policy victory to strengthen its prestige at home also spurred the implementation of the union. Brüning, who was facing increasingly strong opposition from the National Socialists, was keen to see the plan come to fruition.

== Interpretations of the plan ==
The purpose of the plan was highly controversial. For some, it was a measure to alleviate the severe economic crisis, part of the "Briand plan" to form a European union; for others, it was a first step for the German takeover of Austria, presented by the German government with the aim of gaining political mileage from a possible foreign policy success. The customs union of the German states in the previous century had led to the formation of the empire. Despite German denials, the German Foreign Office regarded the plan as a temporary substitute for annexation and a first step in this direction. This eventual absorption of the Austrian republic, together with a series of bilateral agreements with the Balkan nations in which Germany offered reduced tariffs and which were then being discussed, could have led to Germanic domination of southeastern Europe. In the long term, economic pressure could force Czechoslovakia to join the customs union —Austria and Germany together accounted for 35% of Czechoslovak exports— and the latter, reinforced by new treaties with the Baltic republics, could in turn force Poland to give in and surrender the territories desired by Berlin.

The economic consequences of the union were expected to be mixed: German industry hoped to expand into Austria —a situation that worried many Austrian industrialists— while farmers looked askance at Austrian competition. Although Austrian industry wanted to improve its access to the large German market, part of it would have preferred to regain the former Austro-Hungarian market rather than face German competition. It is thought likely that the customs union would have favored the German economy as a whole almost immediately, while it would only have benefited the Austrian economy in the long run, after considerable adjustments. Given the desire of the two countries to forge a political union, it is considered likely that the customs union would have facilitated the establishment of a single nation —in reality, the absorption of Austria by Germany, which would have strengthened its industrial and military might—.

== Austro-German bilateral negotiations ==
=== First contacts and plan stalemate ===
Although the first moves toward closer Austro-German economic relations had taken place in 1927, they had been minimal. It was Austrian Foreign Minister Schober's various contacts with various countries —especially his visit to Mussolini in early 1930 to resolve the South Tyrol crisis— that alarmed both Austrian supporters of union with Germany and German leaders, who decided to take advantage of the minister's visit to Berlin in February 1930 to raise the possibility of a customs union between the two countries. It was to prevent Austria from opting for an alternative union —either with Italy or with the countries of the Danube basin— to try to solve its economic problems that would frustrate a future political union with Germany.

The negotiations between Schober and Curtius began with Schober's visit to Berlin at the end of February 1930. Although the Austrian representatives raised the question of a customs union with little hope, foreseeing that the victorious countries of the world war would oppose it, Curtius successfully advocated beginning to study the feasibility of the project. In the following months, however, the plan made no progress, while German leaders were suspicious of the Austrian government's negotiations with France, Italy and the Eastern European countries, which they feared could lead to the disintegration of the union. Should Austria choose to ask France or other nations for help, even in exchange for accepting political conditions detrimental to German interests, the Reich, whose economic situation had worsened markedly since the beginning of 1930 - with the end of the granting of the credits on which it depended so heavily and even the early repayment of some of them - could not offer an alternative that would prevent it. In March the last German cabinet with a parliamentary majority in the history of the Weimar Republic, headed by the Social Democrat Hermann Müller, resigned. The new government of the Catholic centrist Heinrich Brüning adopted a deflationary policy to deal with the economic crisis, which enabled it to obtain a last international loan, but by the end of the summer the German political and economic situation had again deteriorated. The September elections confirmed popular discontent and the National Socialists greatly increased their number of seats.

In the late summer of 1930, at the initiative of the Austrians, negotiations were resumed. Curtius and Schober met in Geneva and progress was made in outlining the details of the plan, but the resignation of the Schober cabinet on September 25 due to a scandal was a setback. The new government, headed by Carl Vaugoin and with Seipel as Foreign Minister, was not in favor of continuing the negotiations, or so the German Executive believed. During the two months of this short-lived cabinet, the customs union plan came to a standstill.

=== The project is resumed ===
When Schober returned to the government as vice-chancellor and foreign minister at the beginning of December, contacts with Berlin were immediately resumed. The Germans presented a draft customs union on January 2, 1931, which the Austrians accepted three days later. At a meeting in Geneva on January 15, Curtius and Schober reached further agreements on the details of the draft: it was not to be announced until negotiations on the details had been concluded, it was to be presented as part of the plan for European union, and the announcement was to be made by the Austrians, in an attempt to avoid accusations that the Germans were reviving the question of the annexation of Austria.

During Curtius' visit to Vienna from March 3 to 5, 1931, the Austrian leaders, including the President of the Republic Wilhelm Miklas and Chancellor Otto Ender, officially approved the union plan and it was agreed that it should be presented not as a treaty but as a preliminary agreement. In fact, preparations were so far advanced that the union treaty could have been signed immediately, but it was decided to present only a protocol as a draft of the final treaty so as not to give the impression that the process had been concluded secretly, behind the backs of the powers. It was also agreed to inform the Councils of Ministers of the two countries in the following weeks and the nations concerned in May during the session of the Commission of Inquiry for the European Union. The German Council of Ministers approved the plan on March 18 and the Austrian one day later. German Foreign Ministry experts and leading ambassadors, however, expressed doubts about its feasibility, predicting little support from the UK and Italy and fierce French and Czechoslovak opposition.

The draft treaty outlined during the German minister's visit to Vienna included: the unification of tariffs based on German ones, the elimination of tariffs for Austrian products imported by Germany, the maintenance of the two customs bodies, the joint negotiation of new trade agreements with third countries and the duration of the union —between three and five years—. To avoid criticism from other countries, a clause was included which provided for other nations to join the project if they wished to do so.

== Plan announcement ==
Originally, Germany and Austria had decided to announce the customs union plan at the scheduled session of the European Union Study Commission in May 1931. However, the leak of the plan in Vienna in March and the impending meeting of the commission in Paris on the 21st of the month forced the announcement to be brought forward. According to Schober, however, the advance was due to German pressure, not to the leak of the plan. On March 10, the Germans had insisted on bringing the announcement forward to the week of March 23. Most likely, various leaks in both Germany and Austria, together with the lack of clear agreement on the dates and the weakening of the Brüning cabinet, led to an earlier proclamation of the union plans. Although the Austrian government had wished to consult the Great Powers before submitting the plan, haste prevented this.

The official announcement was made on March 21, but days earlier the French and Czechoslovaks had already sensed its existence. The announcement triggered a political crisis in Europe, which ended six months later with the failure of the plan due to French opposition.

Austrians and Germans presented the protocol as a contribution to efforts to consolidate peace and restore European prosperity, part of plans for continental union. In reality, it was a step toward the formation of a German-dominated Central European union and an attempt to keep Austria from finally agreeing to join some kind of Danubian organization. For the Austrians, it was a breakthrough in what they saw as the solution to their political and economic problems: union with the Reich.

== Reactions ==
The day after the communiqué, the ambassadors of Czechoslovakia, France and Italy presented the protests of their respective governments to the Austrian government. Czechoslovakia flatly rejected the Austro-German union: most of its foreign trade was with the two nations and, should they unite in any way, it would become totally dependent on them. The most heated statements against the project were therefore made by Czechoslovak representatives. In addition to requesting the help of France to thwart what they considered a serious threat to their independence, the Czechoslovaks reacted by abandoning the economic talks they had held with the Austrians. They also spread rumors of possible secret military clauses and warned the Germans that, if the project was not abandoned, a French economic boycott could be unleashed, which would severely damage Germans —who were profiting from bilateral trade with France— and Austrians.

The memory of the importance of the customs union in the emergence of the German Empire worried those who rejected a strengthening of the Reich. The main opposition came from France. Briand, the French Foreign Minister, who days earlier had ruled out in the Cortes any risk of a German takeover of Austria, mentioned to the British the possibility that France might rescind the economic concessions enjoyed by Austria and begin to raise tariffs with Germany. Berlin foresaw French opposition, but not its intensity; for Paris, the Austro-German union strengthened the Reich's population advantage, was a step toward the formation of a German-controlled central Europe, and increased the danger of German economic domination on the continent.

The United Kingdom did not protest initially, but later it was the United Kingdom that requested the League of Nations to study the project, which in turn requested an evaluation —which was not binding— from the Permanent Court of Arbitration in The Hague. For the British, less fearful than the French of the resurgence of German power, the failure of the plan could mean the end of the Brüning Government, and give way to a National Socialist one. Nor were they opposed to the absorption of Austria by Germany, since they considered that the small country could not support itself economically. The British ambassador in Berlin presented this request to the Society on March 26, which was supported by the French government. The Austrians and Germans agreed to the British request.

Opponents of the union began to put diplomatic pressure on the two countries and Austria came to fear —although the fear was unfounded— a Franco-Czechoslovak invasion to prevent it by force.

On the other hand, Germany rejected any interference by third countries in the plan and declared that the bilateral talks would continue, despite their rejection. According to Chancellor Brüning, any formal French protest could lead to the fall of his government. Austria, which had agreed its response to the reactions of the other countries with Germany, presented a more moderate and conciliatory statement. Indeed, Schober did not rule out a legal evaluation of the project by the League of Nations, a possibility that Brüning had flatly rejected. Faced with the British request at the end of March, the German government finally agreed to allow the plan to be studied by the League of Nations, so that it could be verified that it did not violate the 1922 agreements, but warned that this would not stop negotiations with Vienna to conclude the union treaty.

The Germans rejected Austrian proposals to include Hungary and Italy in the project, as this would have jeopardized the political objective of the project, Austro-German political union, even though it would have reduced hostility between some countries. Despite the clause allowing other nations to join the plan, Berlin made sure that this did not happen.

In early May, Italy communicated its opposition to the project, which it perceived as a mere prelude to the political union of Austria and Germany. Yugoslavia and Romania, favorable to the Austro-German union for economic reasons – the union would have created a large market to which Berlin was offering them preferential access – finally opposed the project due to pressure from their French and Czechoslovak allies.

== Creditanstalt bankruptcy and Austrian financial weaknesses ==
Despite Schober and Curtius' intention to fiercely defend the union project in Geneva before the League of Nations, the sudden worsening of the Austrian economic crisis in May thwarted their plans. The Austrian economic situation had begun to deteriorate at the end of 1929. The dismemberment of the Austro-Hungarian Empire and rising postwar inflation had weakened the Austrian banking system. By 1929, the country's main bank, the Creditanstalt, had absorbed the bankrupt Boden-kreditanstalt, which was one hundred and forty million schillings in debt. Until the end of 1930, however, the country managed to retain both its gold and foreign exchange reserves, although it was heavily dependent on short-term foreign credits.

Austrian economic weakness and its dependence on French financial aid gave Paris some facility to frustrate the customs union. As early as the beginning of April, the Austrians were already trying to apply for a French credit, even though this entailed accepting political conditions. To begin with, on April 6 the French Government demanded that Schober promise not to continue negotiations with Germany before the next session of the League of Nations was held. Despite initially lacking British cooperation, the French continued to press the Austrians. The bankruptcy of the largest Austrian bank, the Creditanstalt, which held 60 % of the credits to the national industry, in May 1931 allowed France to increase the pressure on Austria and finally force it to abandon the project of customs union with Germany. For the time being, at the League of Nations session of May 18, the British succeeded in getting Schober to publicly commit himself not to continue negotiations with Germany until the decision of the Hague Tribunal was known, a promise which satisfied the French.

The first consequence of the Austrian bank failure was the depreciation of the shilling as savers tried to buy foreign currency to secure their money. Two weeks later, the National Bank, overwhelmed by the situation, asked the government in vain to temporarily close the banks. France knowingly aggravated the Austrian financial problem by withdrawing funds from Austrian banks, in order to force Austria to admit the political conditions it wished to impose in order to grant the credit of one hundred and fifty million which the Viennese Government needed to cover the losses of the National Bank. Germany was not in a position to provide the financial aid the Austrians needed. A first emergency credit granted on the evening of June 16 by the Bank of England —the United Kingdom was the principal creditor of the Creditanstalt and of the Austrian state and did not wish the latter to suspend payments— foiled the French plans temporarily, but did not solve the Austrian problems, which continued to depend on French credit. The extension of the financial crisis to Germany hit the United Kingdom hard, which in August had to accept U.S. and French credits and could therefore no longer bail out the Austrians; London demanded repayment of the emergency credit. Privately, Schober admitted that by then the plan for a customs union with Germany had been discarded. The bankruptcy of the Creditanstalt and the subsequent national financial crisis sealed the failure of the Austro-German customs union plan. France, the only possible lender for the Austrian bonds that were to be used to cover the debts, clearly demanded the abandonment of the customs union; financial aid was conditional on the cancellation of the project. On August 10, Austria officially requested aid from the League of Nations, and France demanded the maintenance of Austrian political and economic independence, which meant the end of the customs union project.

== Project abandonment and consequences ==
The Hague tribunal's negative ruling was finally announced in September, after the plan had been abandoned. The majority against the union had been very slim, but the result was inconsequential. The official announcement of the abandonment was made on September 3, although two days earlier in an interview Schober had ruled out that it would happen. French pressure and Austrian economic hardship, however, prompted the announcement. French pressure and Austrian economic hardship, however, prompted the announcement. Despite Curtius' attempts to present the plan as the beginning of a greater European union, in Germany the resignation was perceived as a surrender and a campaign was unleashed demanding the dismissal of the foreign minister. Two days later, on September 5, the unfavorable ruling of the Hague Tribunal was announced: eight judges had voted against the project and seven in favor. The ruling indicated that the plan did not violate the Treaty of Saint-Germain-en-Laye, but did violate the clauses of the 1922 stabilization agreement signed by Austria.

German public opinion showed its displeasure at what it considered a forced abandonment of the plan and condemned the resignation of the Foreign Minister in Geneva. Nor did it appreciate French moderation, which avoided rejoicing in the Austro-German failure. Nationalist agitation grew.

On October 3, after a council of ministers discussed the failure of the customs union, Curtius resigned.

== Bibliography ==
- Bennett, Edward W. (2021) [1931]. Germany and the diplomacy of the financial crisis, 1931. Creative Media Partners, LLC]. p. 342. ISBN 9781014733887.
- Gil Aguado, Iago (2001). "The Creditanstalt Crisis of 1931 and the Failure of the Austro-German Customs Union Project". The Historical Journal. 44 (1): 199–221. doi:10.1017/S0018246X01001728. JSTOR 3133667. S2CID 159672965.
- Gulick, Charles Adams (1948). Austria from Habsburg to Hitler. Vol. 2. University of California Press. p. 1906. OCLC 312557122.
- Newman, M. D. (1976). "Britain and the German-Austrian Customs Union Proposal of 1931". European History Quarterly. 6 (4): 449–472.
- Orde, Anne (1980). "The Origins of the German-Austrian Customs Union Affair of 1931". Central European History. 13 (1): 34–59. doi:10.1017/S0008938900008992. JSTOR 4545885. S2CID 145649297.
- Stambrook, F. G. (1961). "The German-Austrian Customs Union Project of 1931: A Study of German Methods and Motives". Journal of Central European Affairs. 21: 15–44.
