= Heinrich Timmerevers =

German prelate of the Catholic Church (born 1952)

- Bishop of Dresden-Meißen
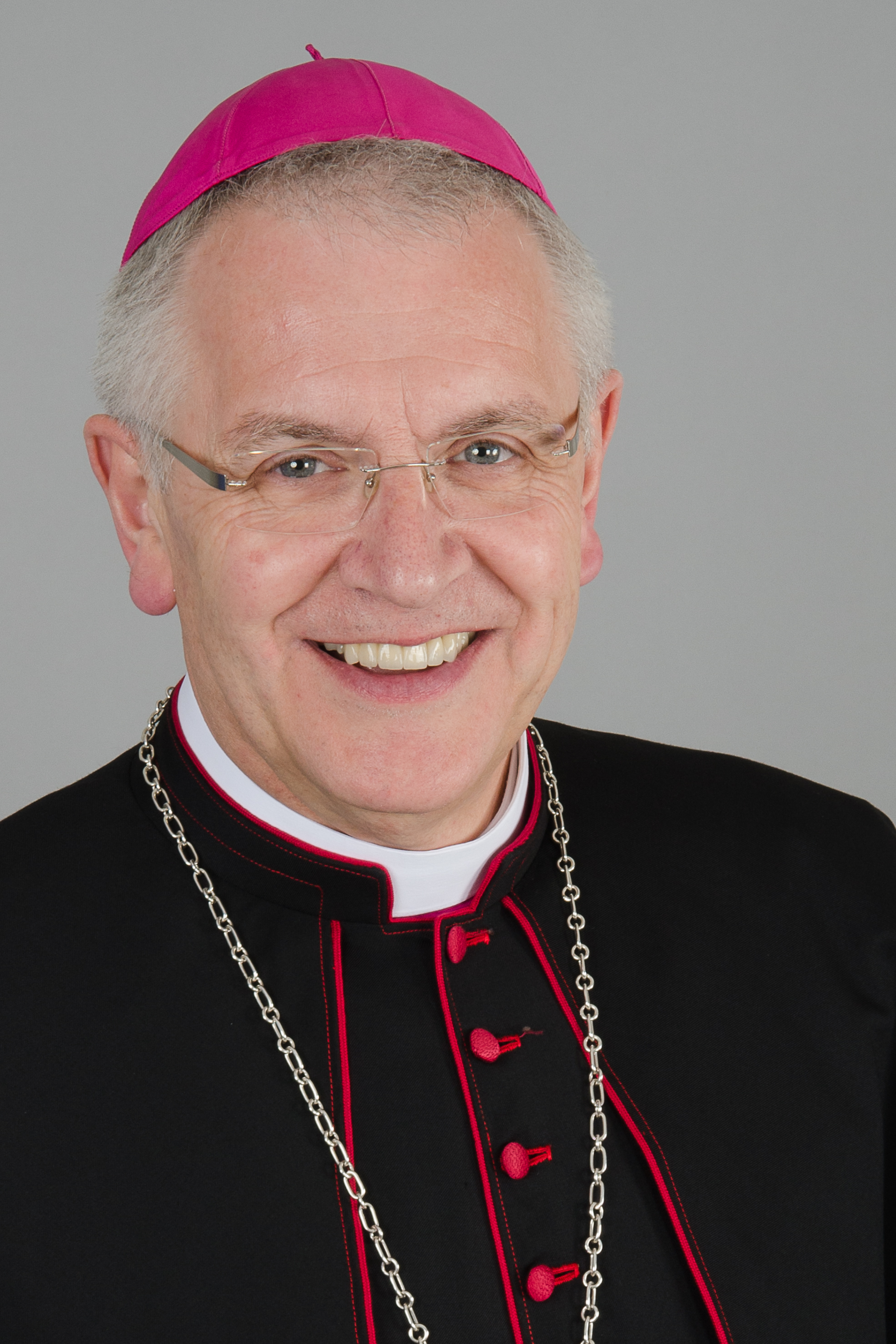
- Heinrich Timmerevers in 2016
- Church: Catholic Church
- Diocese: Diocese of Dresden–Meißen
- Appointed: 29 April 2016
- Term ended: 2 September 2026
- Predecessor: Heiner Koch
- Previous posts: Titular Bishop of Tulana (2001-2016); Auxiliary Bishop of Münster (2001-2016)

Orders
- Ordination: 25 May 1980
- Consecration: 2 September 2001 by Reinhard Lettmann

Personal details
- Born: 25 August 1952 (age 74) Nikolausdorf, Garrel, Lower Saxony, West Germany
- Motto: Suchet Wo Christus Ist
- Coat of arms: Heinrich Timmerevers's coat of arms

Heinrich Timmerevers (born 25 August 1952) is a German prelate of the Catholic Church. A bishop since 2001, he was the 50th Bishop of Dresden-Meissen since 2016 until his resignation in 2026.

== Early life and career ==
Timmerevers was born in Nikolausdorf in Kreis Cloppenburg in Lower Saxony, West Germany, on 25 August 1952, the second of six children in a family of farmers in an all-Catholic community. He attended Clemens-August-Gymnasium in Cloppenburg. He studied theology and philosophy at the University of Münster and at University of Freiburg. He was ordained a priest on 25 May 1980. From 1980 to 1984 he worked as vicar in Visbek. From 1984 to 1989 he was vice-director of the theology college in Münster and cathedral vicar. He then returned to parish work in Visbek in 1990.

On 6 July 2001, Pope John Paul II appointed him titular bishop of Tulana and Auxiliary Bishop of Münster. He received his episcopal consecration on 2 September 2001 from Reinhard Lettmann, Bishop of Münster. In accordance with local practice, he led the Oldenburg region based in Vechta as an "enclave diocese" more in the manner of an ordinary than an auxiliary. He also met regularly with the evangelical bishop of Oldenburg. He advocated for the liberalization of Germany's immigration policies to "show Germany as an open country" and on behalf of refugees and Christians persecuted in the Middle East. He said that "attitudes that spring from right-wing extremist ideology have no place in the Church".

== Dresden-Meissen ==
On 29 April 2016, Pope Francis named him Bishop of Dresden-Meissen. Following his appointment, in interviews he underscored his commitment to developing a welcoming culture toward immigrants and friendly relations with Protestants. He advocated for attempting to maintain dialogue with the nationalist anti-Islamic party, Pegida, which was founded in Dresden, his new home city, but said there were limits to what could be debated: "If someone disdains other people by skin color or religion, then I say, that's not okay. No one has the right to deny another person his inviolable dignity. That must be the basic consensus. Communicating this attitude is a Christian duty, but also generally a human duty in our society. That is what we have to do, not least because of our German history." He was installed as Bishop of Dresden-Meissen on 27 August 2016.

In November 2019 he told the Synod of the German Evangelical Church that churches that hear "cries for justice and peace" must "side radically with the poorest". He praised the warm relationship among the Christian churches in Germany and asked for their support as the Catholic Church continued to address clerical sexual abuse in the Catholic Church. In a speech in Leipzig in December 2019 at the beginning of the German bishops' national synod process, Timmerevers identified the status of women as the Church's "great dilemma", serious enough to threaten Church unity. He said: "What I perceive hurts me very much, in three respects: that many women suffer, that this question has a potential to divide our church and that we bishops are held liable for it." He said he was open to allowing some priests to marry though he considers celibacy the ideal.

Timmerevers is a member of the Focolare Movement, which is dedicated in social cohesion and dialogue. Within the German Bishops Conference he was a member of the Youth Commission for eight years and has served on other committees for more than a decade, including those for Consecrated Life and Spiritual Professions. Since 2016 he has been a member of the Pastoral Commission and of the Joint Conference of the Bishops Conference and the Central Committee of German Catholics. Since January 2012 he has performed pastoral work on behalf of the Order of Malta and served on its national governing board.

In September 2020, Timmerevers expressed support for the blessing of same-sex marriages in the Roman-Catholic Church.

On 2 September 2026, Pope Leo XIV accepted his resignation from the pastoral care of the Diocese of Dresden-Meissen.

Catholic Church titles
| Preceded by Heiner Koch | Bishop of Dresden-Meissen; 2016-2026 | Vacant |
