= Josef Lenzel =

German Roman Catholic priest (1890–1942)

Josef Lenzel

Josef Lenzel (21 April 1890 – 3 July 1942) was a German Roman Catholic priest active in resistance movement against the National Socialism, who died in the Dachau concentration camp where he had been sent as a result of his work with Polish forced labourers.

== Biography ==
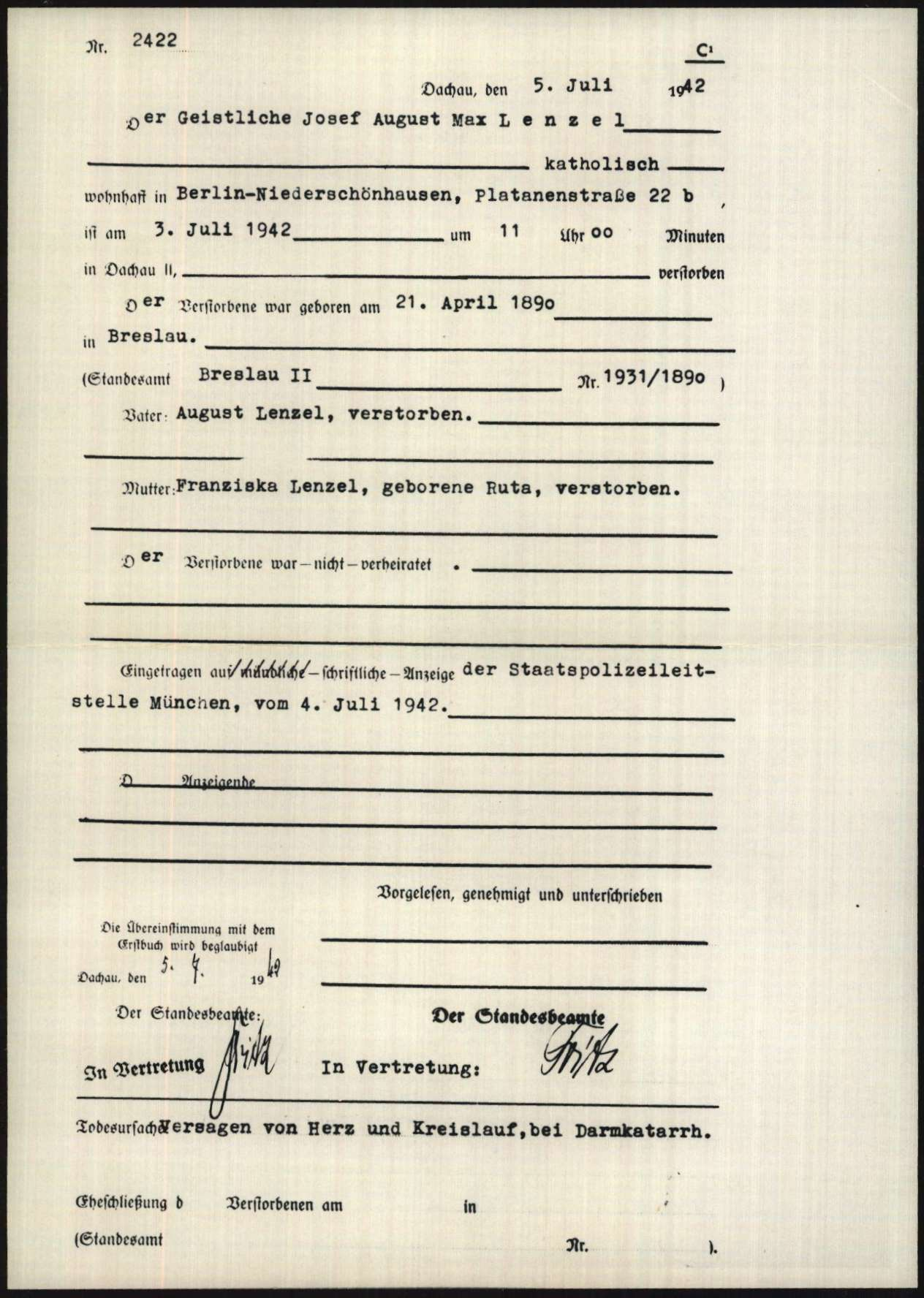
Death certificate of Josef Lenzel while a prisoner in Dachau Nazi Concentration Camp. Reported cause of death: “Heart and circulation failure caused by intestinal catarrh.”

Lenzel was born in 1891 in Breslau (now Wrocław) in Prussian Silesia. In 1911, he started his theological studies at the University in Breslau, and was ordained as a priest on 3 June 1915 in Breslau Cathedral. He became a vicar in Wołów immediately after this, and in 1916 became a vicar in Berlin-Pankow. In 1929, he became a rector, then a titulary provost of St Mary Magdalene's parish in Berlin-Niederschönhausen. During the Second World War, he helped Polish obligatory workers in his parish; his help was viewed unkindly by local Nazi authorities. In January 1942, during his preparations for a mass for maltreated Poles, he was arrested by the Gestapo and then sent to the Dachau concentration camp. He died there on 3 July 1942 from ill-treatment and exhaustion.

== Memorials ==
- Commemorative plaque in a crypt of St. Hedwig's Cathedral,
- Commemorative plaque on a symbolic tomb in memorial of Josef Lenzel, in front of St Mary Magdalene's parish in Berlin-Niederschönhausen
- Street named Pfarrer-Lenzel-Straße in Berlin-Pankow.
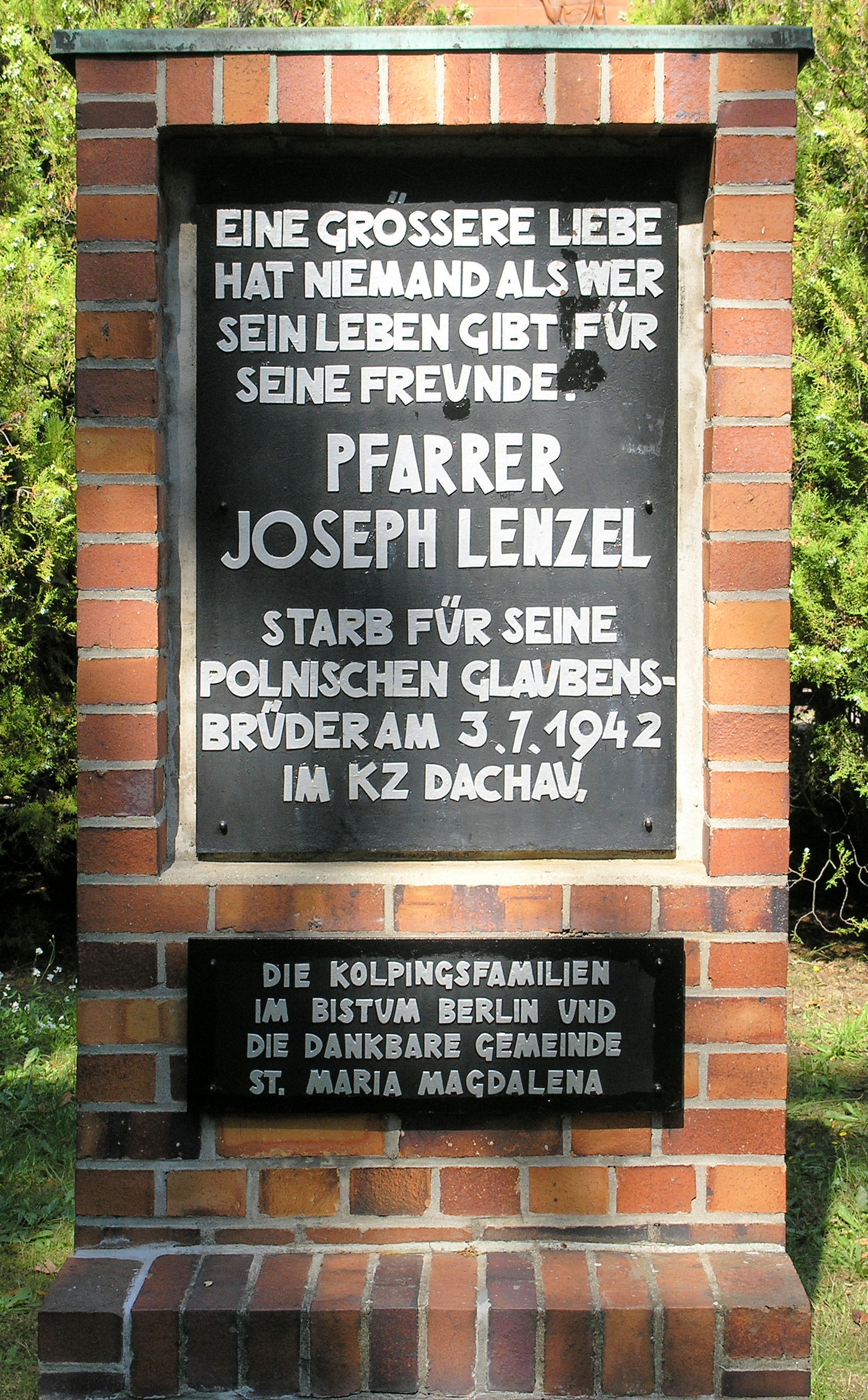
Commemorative plaque in front of St Mary Magdalene's parish on 22 Platanenstraße street in Berlinie-Niederschönhausen, in memorial of priest Josef Lenzel, that gave his life for Poles – brothers in faith

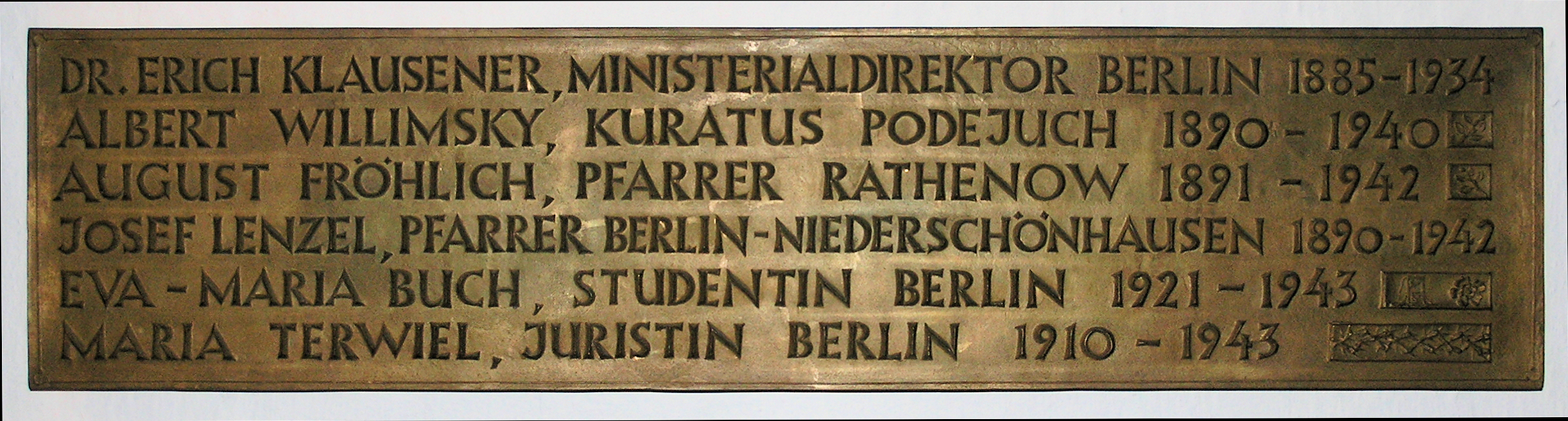
A part of a commemorative plaque in memorial of Catholics of Archdiocese of Berlin murdered during the war, in a crypt of St. Hedwig's Cathedral in Berlin

== Bibliography ==
- Helmut Moll, Ursula Pruss, Pfarrer Josef Lenzel. In: Zeugen für Christus. Das deutsche Martyrologium des 20. Jahrhunderts. von im Auftrag der Deutschen Bischofskonferenz. site 101–104. Verlag Ferdinand Schöningh, Paderborn 1999
- Heinz Kühn, Blutzeugen des Bistums Berlin. Klausener, Lichtenberg, Lampert, Lorenz, Simoleit, Mandrella, Hirsch, Wachsmann, Metzger, Schäfer, Willimsky, Lenzel, Froehlich. Morus-Verlag, Berlin 1952
