= Heiner Koch =

German prelate of the Catholic Church (born 1954)

His Excellency Heiner Koch
- Archbishop of Berlin
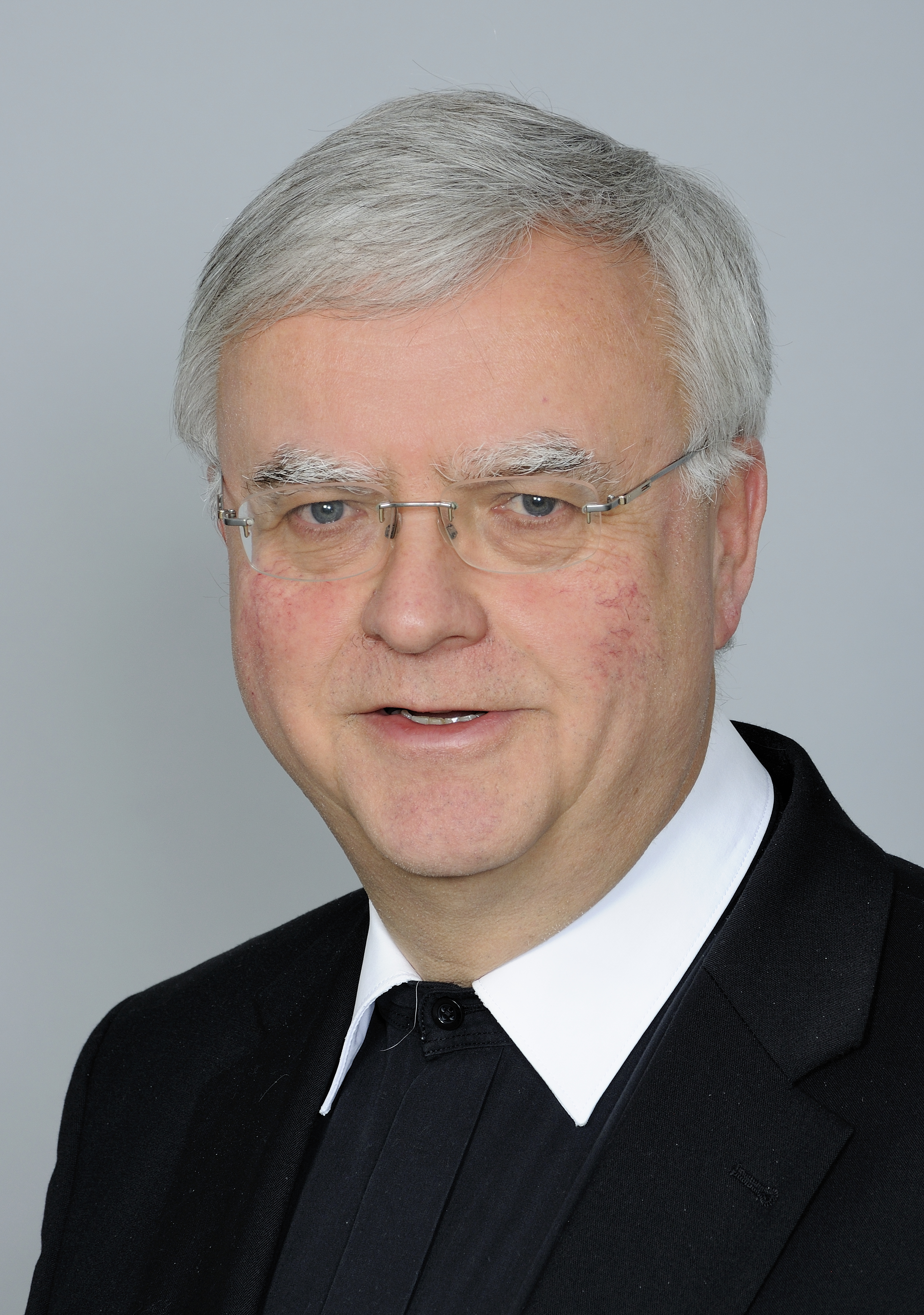
- Church: Roman Catholic
- Archdiocese: Berlin
- Appointed: 8 June 2015
- Installed: 19 September 2015
- Predecessor: Rainer Maria Woelki
- Previous posts: Auxiliary Bishop of Cologne (2006–2013); Bishop of Dresden-Meissen (2013–2015)

Orders
- Ordination: 13 June 1980
- Consecration: 7 May 2006 by Joachim Meisner

Personal details
- Born: Heiner Koch; 13 June 1954 (age 72) Düsseldorf, West Germany
- Denomination: Roman Catholic
- Education: University of Bonn
- Motto: Gaudete semper Dominus prope ('Rejoice always, the Lord is near')
- Coat of arms

Styles of Heiner Koch
- Reference style: The Most Reverend
- Spoken style: Excellency
- Religious style: Monsignor

Heiner Koch (born 13 June 1954) is a German Catholic prelate who has served as Archbishop of Berlin since 2015. He was an auxiliary bishop in Cologne from 2006 to 2013 and Bishop of Dresden-Meissen from 2013 to 2015.

== Early life and career ==
Koch was born on 13 June 1954 in Düsseldorf, West Germany. He studied theology, philosophy and education at the University of Bonn and completed his examinations in education science. He was ordained a priest of the Diocese of Cologne on 13 June 1980, his 26th birthday. He held a variety of positions in Cologne and was often involved in youth ministry. While doing parish work he earned a doctorate in theology with a dissertation on the significance of liberation in Christian religious education. Since 1995 he has been president of the Federation of Historic German Shooting Clubs (German: Historischer Deutschen Schützenbruderschaften (BHDS)). Beginning in 2002 he served as Pro-Vicar General and Secretary General for the committee that organized the celebration of World Youth Day in Cologne in 2005.

On 17 March 2006, Pope Benedict XVI named him auxiliary bishop of Cologne with the titular see of Ros Cré. He was consecrated a bishop on 7 May 2006 by Joachim Meisner, Archbishop of Cologne, with Manfred Melzer and Rainer Maria Woelki as co-consecrators. He chose as his episcopal motto the Latin phrase Gaudete semper Dominus prope, "Rejoice always, the Lord is near", taken from the Epistle to the Philippians Phil 4:4.

On 18 January 2013, Benedict XVI named him Bishop of Dresden-Meissen, and he was installed there on 16 March.

In December 2014, he warned against dismissing the concerns of anti-immigrant demonstrators. He said: "While we remain committed to the basic right of asylum for refugees from war areas and victims of political persecution, we must ask ourselves what drives such a large number of people on to the streets every Monday and not tar them all with the same brush by a priori labeling them right-wingers."

== Berlin ==
On 8 June 2015, Pope Francis named Koch Archbishop of Berlin. Following the procedures revived in 1989 following the reunion of Germany, Koch was first elected by the Berlin church and Pope Francis, seeing no objection, made the appointment. Koch was installed in Berlin on 16 March.

The German Bishops' Conference selected him in 2014 to chair its Commission for Marriage and the Family.

The German Bishops' Conference selected him as a delegate to the Synod on the Family, which met in Rome in October 2015. In February 2015, discussing the issues facing the synod, he said the church needed a new approach to pastoral care of homosexuals, "a different language", and that to "portray homosexuality as a sin is hurtful". He added: "I know gay couples who value reliability and commitment and live these in an exemplary manner." As the Synod approached, he expressed concern that its focus was shifting from the pastoral concerns it was meant to address to "mega issues such as the understanding of the Eucharist, the issue of church authority and its limits and the question of the definition of marriage". He said "It would have been better to limit the number of topics up for discussion" and "We must not give the impression that the synod spent most of its time quarreling about the conditions for admission to the sacraments." At the synod, the German language discussion group elected him their relator (secretary). (Note: The German language group produced a statement its members endorsed unanimously.)

He told the Synod that theological arguments against allowing Catholics in irregular marriages to receive Communion "do not silence the questions in the hearts of people". He said:

Is there no place at the Lord’s table for people who experienced and suffered an irreversible break in their lives? How perfect and holy must one be to be allowed to the supper of the Lord? It becomes clear to me every time that the question of allowing divorced and remarried people to the Eucharist is not in the first place a question about the indissolubility of the sacrament of marriage.... Many people question the Church and her mercy in this regard. More than a few people concerned leave the Church with their children on the basis of what they see as rejection. Ultimately and most profoundly it is much more about the Christian faith and God and His mercy. For many, the question of admittance to the Eucharist makes them doubt God.

In February 2016, joining an alliance with the German Evangelical Church called the Alliance for Cosmopolitanism (German: Allianz für Weltoffenheit) Koch spoke on behalf of the German Bishops Conference: "Those who contribute words or deeds to the exclusion and reduction of refugees and migrants can not base that on Christianity. Human hostility and stranger hatred are not only in clear contradiction to the values of our free-democratic constitution, but ultimately bear witness to a deep disregard for the Christian message." He has at other times called for special attention to the needs of Christian refugees, who are sometimes mistreated as a minority among the refugee population, and for refugees who are homosexual or transgender.

Koch, though an advocate for reconciliation between the Church and the LGBT community, denounced the German Bundestag's vote to legalize same-sex marriage on 30 June 2017. He said "As a Church, we respect same-sex partnerships in which mutual responsibility and care are taken" but he argued for maintaining a distinction between same-sex and different-sex relationships: "differentiation isn't discrimination, and same-sex cohabitation can be valued through other institutional arrangements without opening up the legal institute of marriage".

Koch asked forgiveness for the church’s discrimination against people because of their sexual orientation. Homophobia was an “unholy line of tradition” in the Catholic Church, Koch said 17 May during an ecumenical service in the Protestant Twelve Apostles Church.

== Notes ==
Catholic Church titles
Preceded by Joachim Friedrich Reinelt	Bishop of Dresden-Meissen; 2013–2015	Succeeded by Heinrich Timmerevers
Preceded by Rainer Maria Woelki	Archbishop of Berlin; 2015–present	Incumbent
