= Poverty in Germany =

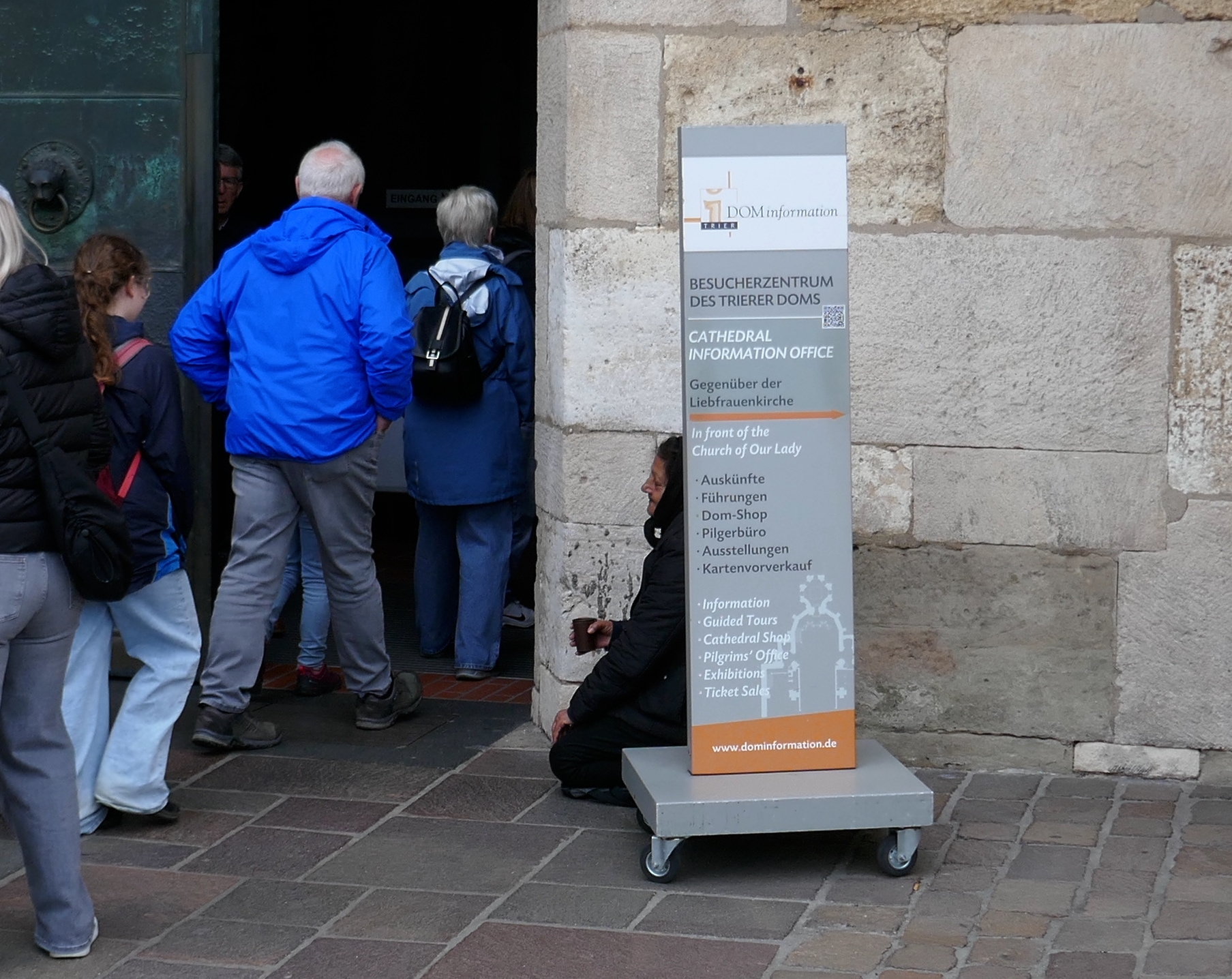
A beggar in Trier, Germany

In recent decades, poverty in Germany has been increasing. Children are more likely to be poor than adults. There has been a strong increase in the number of poor children. In 1965, only one in 75 children lived on welfare, in 2007 one in 6 did.

Poverty rates differ by states. In 2007, only 6.6% of children and 3.9% of all citizens in states like Bavaria were impoverished. In Berlin, 15.2% of the inhabitants and 30.7% of the children received welfare payments.

The German Kinderhilfswerk, an organization caring for children in need has demanded the government to do something about the poverty problem.

As of 2015, poverty in Germany was at its highest since the German reunification (1990). Some 12.5 million Germans are now classified as poor.

== Statistics ==
Bundesland (state)	Children on the welfare rolls (percent of all children, in 2015)	People on the welfare rolls (percent of all persons, in 2015)
Bavaria	6.6%	3.9%
Baden-Württemberg	7.2%	4.1%
Rhineland-Palatinate	9.9%	5.5%
Hesse	12.0%	6.5%
Lower Saxony	13.5%	7.6%
North Rhine-Westphalia	14.0%	8.1%
Saarland	14.0%	7.4%
Schleswig-Holstein	14.4%	8.2%
Hamburg	20.8%	10.6%
Thuringia	20.8%	10.4%
Brandenburg	21.5%	12.0%
Saxony	22.8%	11.8%
Mecklenburg-Vorpommern	27.8%	14.9%
Saxony-Anhalt	27.9%	14.2%
Bremen	28.1%	13.8%
Berlin	30.7%	15.2%
^{,}

=== Germany and European Union ===
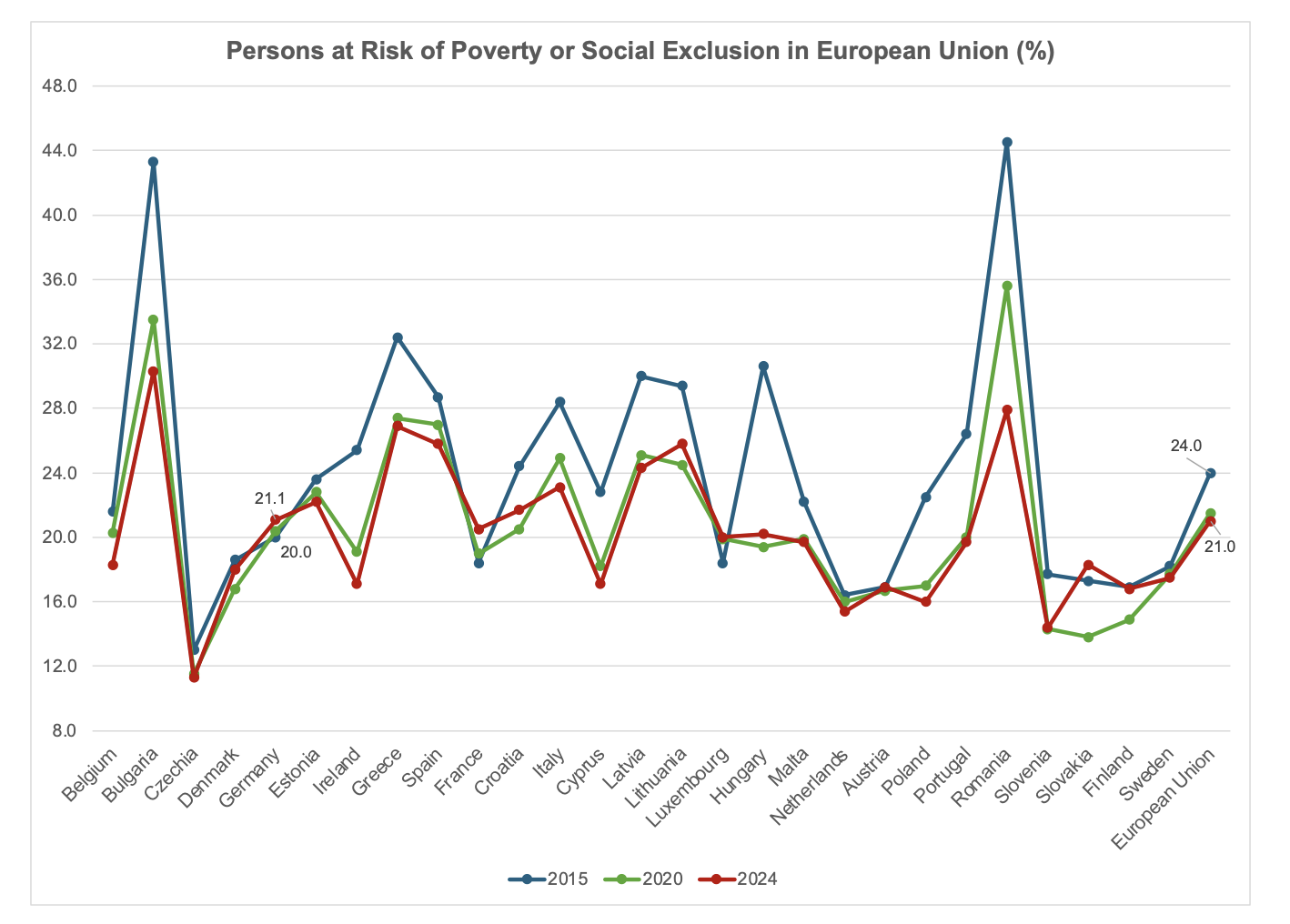
Persons at Risk of Poverty or Social Exclusion in European Union (%)

According to Eurostat, between 2015 and 2024, the proportion of persons at risk of poverty or social exclusion in the European Union (as illustrated in the graph "Persons at Risk of Poverty or Social Exclusion in European Union") has improved by three percentage points. However, Germany is one of the few countries that have recorded a slight increase over the years.

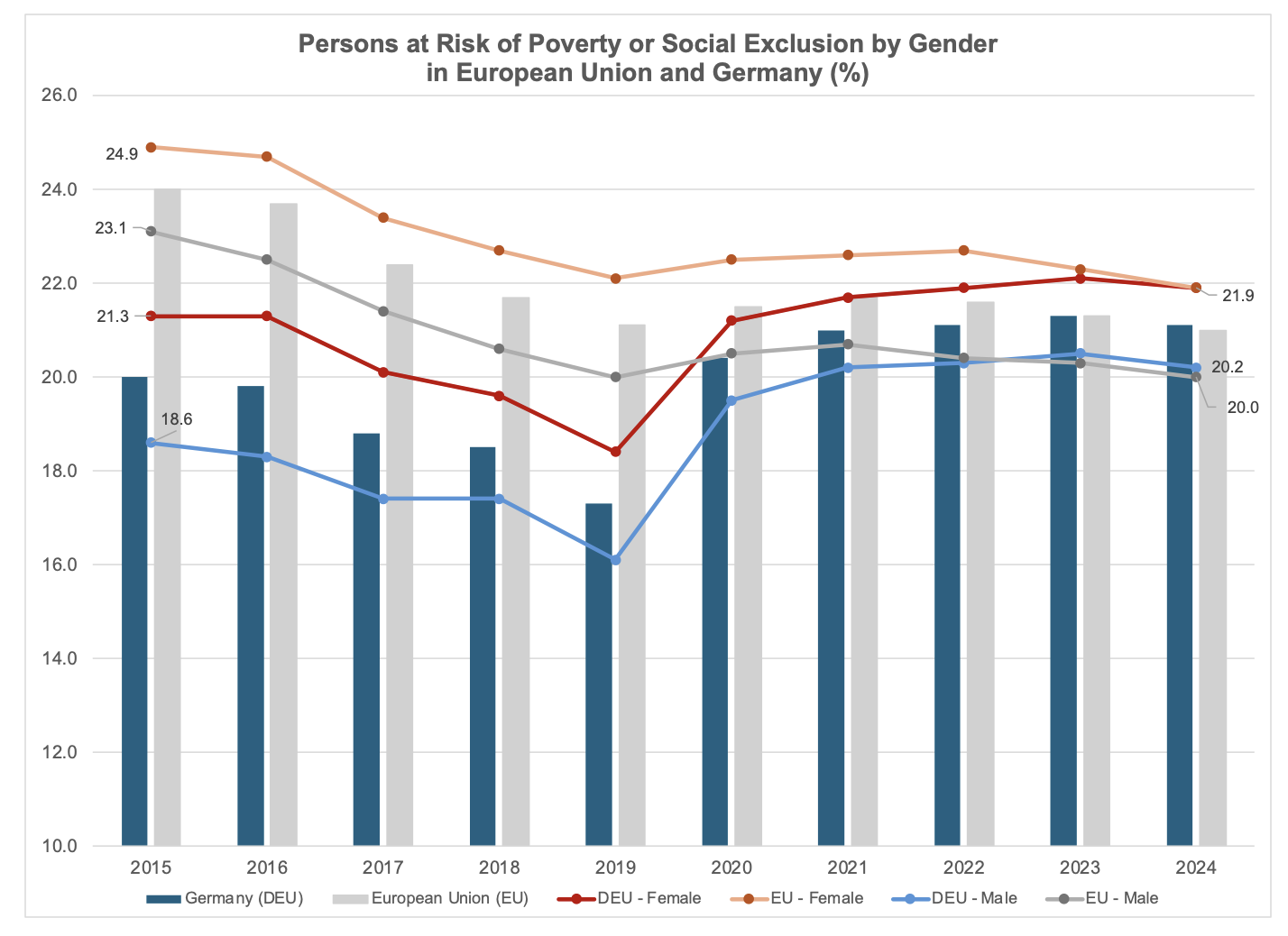
Persons at Risk of Poverty or Social Exclusion by Gender in European Union and Germany (%)

The proportion of persons at risk of poverty or social exclusion visibly varies by gender, according to the data. In the last decade, the discrepancy between the genders lies on average at two percentage points both in Germany and in the European Union. In 2020, a year marked by the beginning of COVID-19 pandemic, there was an increase of approximately three percentage points for both genders (as illustrated in the graph "Persons at Risk of Poverty or Social Exclusion by Gender in European Union and Germany").

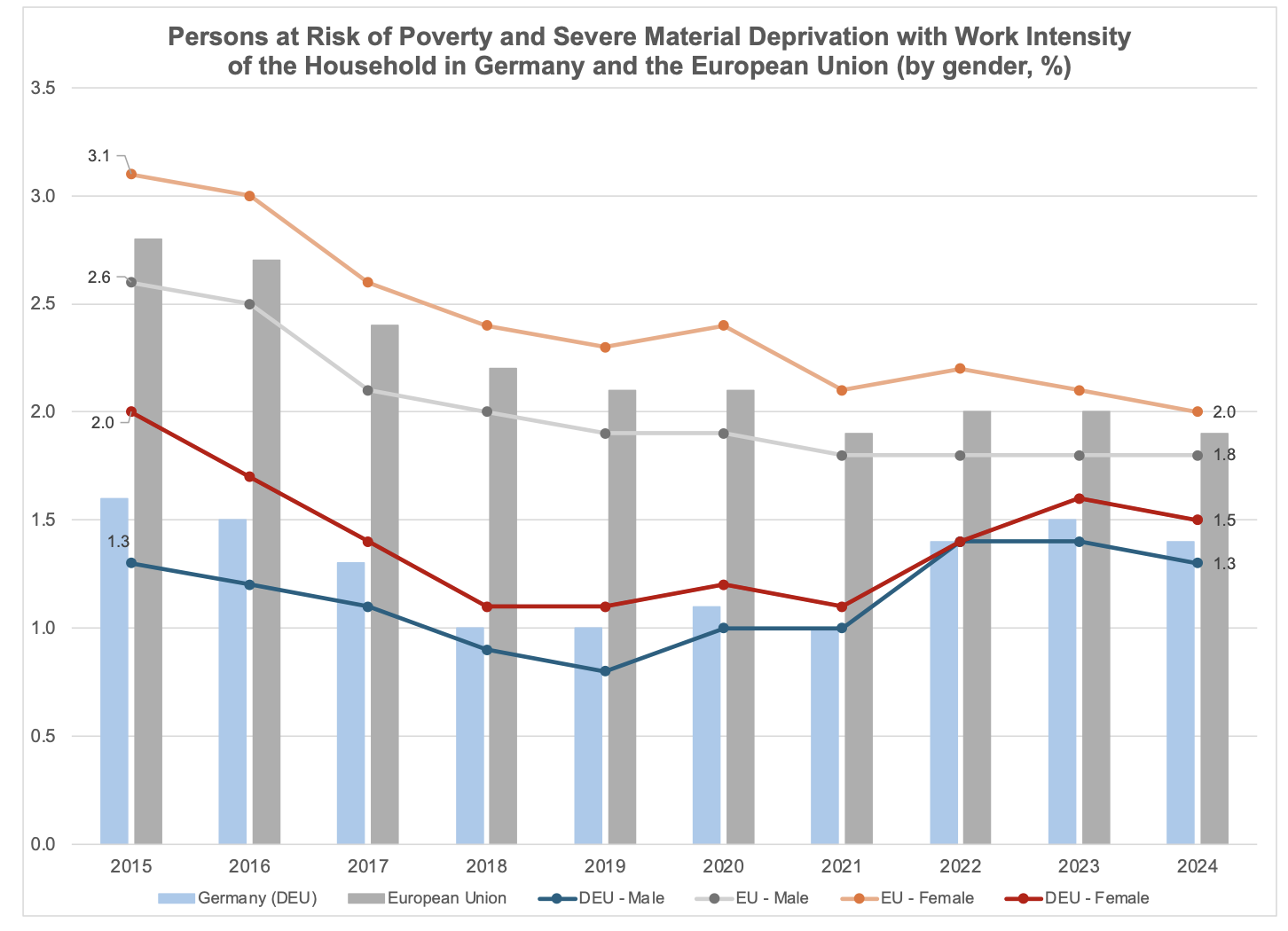
Persons at Risk of Poverty and Severe Material Deprivation with Work Intensity of the Household in Germany and the European Union (by gender, %)

Considering both risk of poverty and severe material deprivation (e.g. food, heating, rent, etc.), combined as a poverty indicator; Germany’s position has been below the European Union with the gap visibly closing (as illustrated in the graph "Persons at Risk of Poverty and Severe Material Deprivation with Work Intensity of the Household in Germany and the European Union"). In 2024, Germany lies around a half percentage point below. The gender gap of the indicator, percentage of persons at risk of poverty and severe material deprivation, has decreased between 2015 to 2024 for both Germany and the European Union.

== Postwar period ==
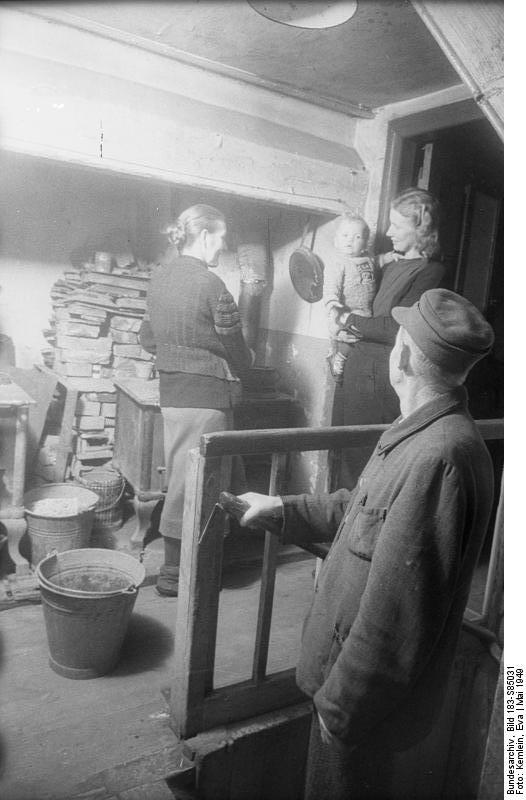
People in a cramped house in Berlin in 1949

During the postwar period, a number of researchers found that (despite years of rising affluence) many West Germans continued to live in poverty. In 1972, a study by the Sozialpolitisches Entscheidungs- und Indikatorensystem (Social Policy Decision-making and Indicator System, or SPES) estimated that poverty effected over a million. In 1975, a report on poverty published by a CDU politician called Heiner Geissler estimated that poverty was at 5.8 million. The report also showed low pay to be a major cause of poverty.

According to another study, 2% of households in West Germany lived in severe poverty (defined as 40% of average living standards), over 7% were in moderate poverty (half the average living standards) and 16% lived in “mild” poverty (defined as 60% of average living standards). A study carried out by the EC Poverty Programme derived a figure for 1973 of 6.6%, using a poverty line of 50% of personal disposable income.

== Consequences of poverty ==
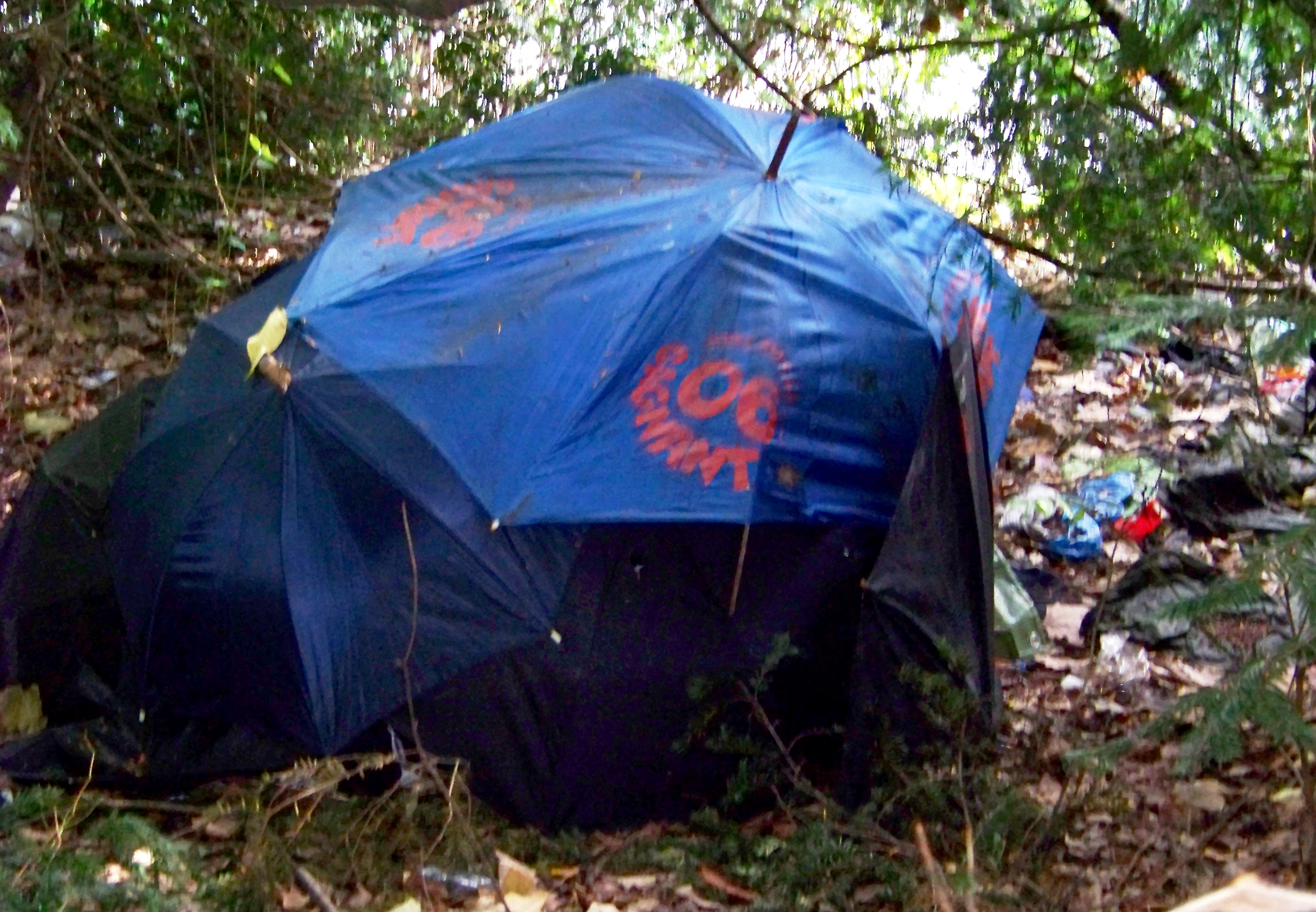
A homeless shelter in Munich

Poor people in Germany are less likely to be healthy than well-off individuals. This is evident in statistics highlighting the lifestyle of this demographic, revealing higher rates of smoking, lack of proper hygiene and nutrition, and lower levels of exercise. Consequently, they face an elevated risk of conditions such as lung cancer, hypertension, heart attacks, diabetes, malnutrition, and various other illnesses. Those that are unemployed are more likely to smoke, more likely to be hospitalized, and more likely to die early than the ones that work. The unhealthy habits that have been shown to go hand in hand with poverty also affect the next generation: they experience higher rates of mental illness and are less active. Poorer teens are more likely to commit suicide. In addition, their mothers are 15 times more likely to smoke while pregnant than their more financially stable counterparts. Furthermore, poverty has been shown to have a negative impact on marital satisfaction. Poor couples are more likely to argue, while being less supportive for each other and their children.

Poor children face limited educational opportunities. According to an AWO-Study, only 9% of the pupils visiting the Gymnasium are poor. Poor children are likely to experience adversities beyond money. They are more likely to be raised by a teenage-parent. They are more likely to have multiple young siblings, are more likely to be raised in crime-ridden neighbourhoods and more likely to live in substandard apartments which are often overcrowded. Their parents are likely to be less educated and they are more likely to have emotional problems.

Children growing up poor are more likely to get involved in accidents than their non-poor peers. They are less likely to follow a healthy diet. They are less likely to be healthy. In poor neighborhoods many children suffer from speech impairments and stunted motoric development. They tend to have lower IQs.

Poor children are more likely to get involved in criminal activities such as forming gangs, committing murder, and they are also more likely to abuse drugs and alcohol.

== Groups most likely to be poor ==
Working-class families from ethnic minorities with multiple children are the group most likely to be poor. Families headed by a single parent are also more likely to experience economic hardship than others. While only 0.9% of childless couples and 2.0% of married couples received welfare in 2002, 26.1% of single mothers did. In 2008, 43% of families headed by a single woman had to rely on welfare as the main source of household income. A change in welfare laws, which made it impossible to receive unemployment benefits if one had not worked for a long time, was accountable for that increase. Poverty rates are high among people that did not graduate from school and did not learn a trade; 42% of poor people did not learn a trade.

== See also ==
- Social issues in Germany
  - Crime in Germany
  - Smoking in Germany
- Immigration to Germany
- Poverty by country
