= Tulana =

Titular see in Tunisia

Africa Proconsularis (125 AD)

Tulana also known as Tulanensis was a civitas (town) of the province of Africa Proconsularis during the Roman Empire.

Very little is known of the town. Its location is now lost and the town is recorded only through the Notitia of Africa and the records of various Church Council. We know of a bishop of the town called Paul in the early 5th century and another named Pascasius who was exiled by the Vandal king Huneric in 484 AD. The ancient bishopric survives today as a titular see of the Roman Catholic Church and Otacilio Ferreira de Lacerda is the current bishop replacing Heinrich Timmerevers, in 2016.
