= Carl Sonnenschein =

German writer and Catholic priest (1876–1929)

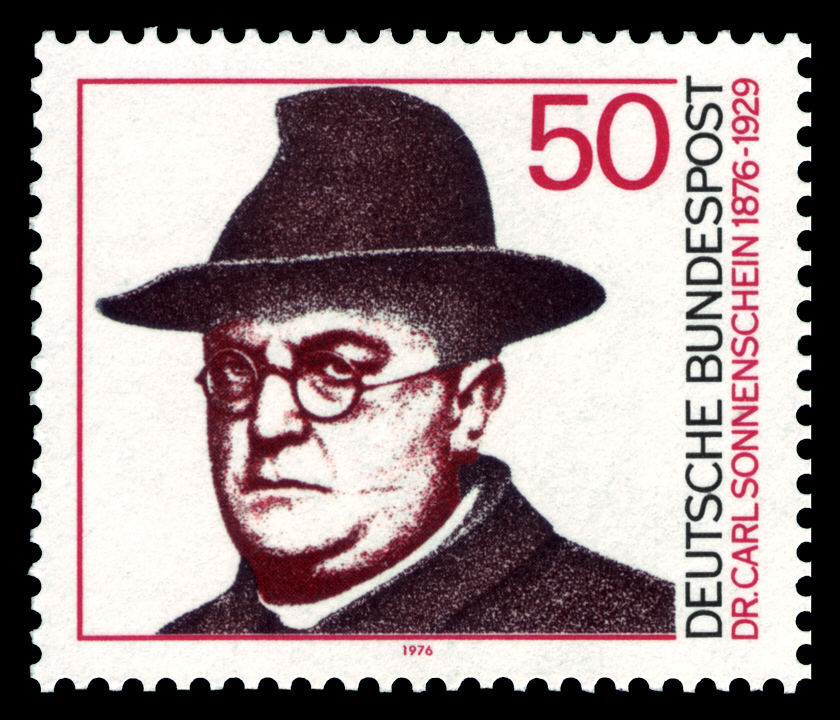
Carl Sonnenschein

Carl Sonnenschein (July 15, 1876 – February 20, 1929) was a German writer and Catholic priest, the founder of the Catholic student movement in Germany.

He was born in Düsseldorf and died in Berlin.

The Catholic Fraternities in Germany (KV) created the annual Carl Sonnenschein prize to award outstanding scientific research in Germany.

== Literary works ==
- Die sozialstudentische Bewegung, 1909
- Notizen (Weltstadtbetrachtungen), Berlin 1926 - 1928
- Sonntagsevangelien (Erklärungen), Berlin 1928
