= Robert Herzog =

Polish bishop (1823-1886)

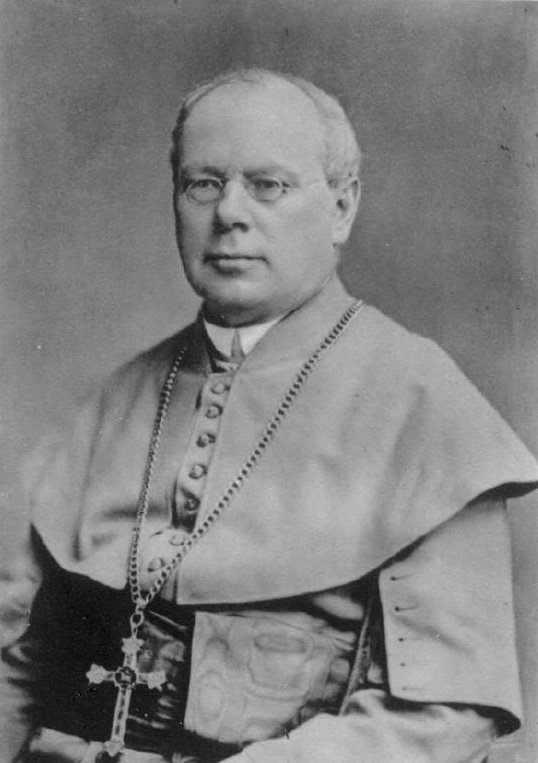

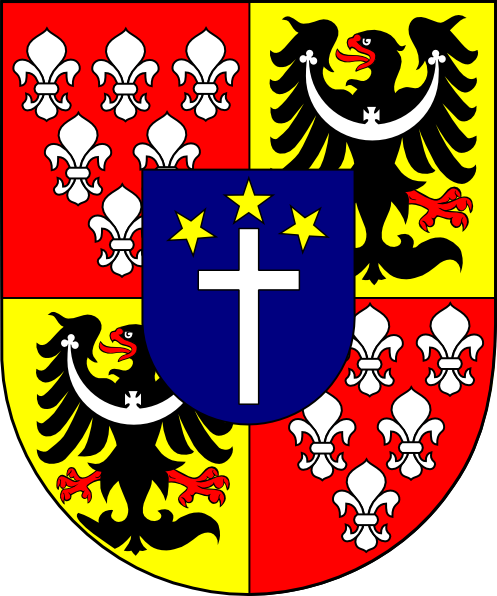
Coat of arms for Herzog Robert

Robert Herzog (1823–1886) was the Roman Catholic diocesan Bishop of Wrocław in 1882–1886.

Born February 17, 1823, in Budzów as the eldest son of a farmer Josef Herzog and his wife Barbara Herold, he graduated from high school in Kłodzko in 1844. Three years later he graduated theology at the University of Wrocław and in 1848 he was ordained a priest.

He was then vicar and teacher of religion in Brzeg and in October 1850 was transferred to Berlin as a curate. In 1857 he returned to Wrocław as administrator of the parish of St. Wojciech. In 1863 he was made parish priest, dean and school inspector in the Brzegu. In 1870 under royal appointment returned to the parish of St. Hedwig in Berlin, as episcopal delegate for Brandenburg and Pomerania and next made Honorary Canon in Wrocław.

At the request of the Prussian authorities, Pope Leo XIII appointed him in 1882 as bishop of the Diocese of Wrocław. As bishop, Herzog removed the pastors with dubious appointments and opposed the teaching of religion in the people's native language. He died on December 26, 1886, in Wrocław.
