= Berlin Conference of Bishops =

The Berlin Conference of Bishops (German: Berliner Bischofskonferenz) was the meeting of Roman Catholic bishops of East Germany from 1976 to 1990. As was solidified after the Berlin Wall in 1961 and was the division of Germany prevented the participation of the bishops of the East of the German Bishops' Conference, the pastoral needs led to a separate meeting of the East German bishops, first of the Berlin Ordinarienkonferenz.

In the following decades, the increased pressure from the government of the GDR built on the Apostolic See, has its own Bishops' Conference as "auctoritas territorialis" and on July 10, 1974 submitted to the ambassador of the GDR in Italy to the Holy See a formal proposal to the East German government, to lead talks at foreign minister level. Although the (West) German Bishops' Conference of this approach was regarded as not conducive to it on July 26, 1976 on the erection of the Berlin Conference of Bishops as an independent, not as a national bishops' conference of the German Democratic Republic.

Great importance was attached to the wording of the statute of the German Bishops' Conference, being confirmed on September 25, 1976 by the Apostolic See. Article 1 designates the German Bishops' Conference as "the union of the bishops of the dioceses of Germany". According to this formulation, including the bishops were on the territory of the GDR continued to German Bishops' Conference. The Bishop of Berlin was represented officially a member of the German Bishops' Conference and sat by his vicar-general of West Berlin.

In 1990, after the reunification of Germany, Berlin and German Bishops' Conference were combined.

== Chairmen ==
- Cardinal Alfred Bengsch, Bishop of Berlin (1976 - 1979)
- Gerhard Schaffran, Bishop of Dresden - Meissen (1980 - 1982)
- Joachim Meisner, Bishop of Berlin (1982 - 1989)
- Joachim Wanke, Apostolic Administrator of the Episcopal Office of Erfurt - Meiningen (1989 provisional)
- Georg Sterzinsky, Bishop of Berlin (1989-1990)

== Structure ==
The canonical system on the territory of the GDR was complicated. Only the Diocese of Meissen was entirely on the territory of the GDR. The diocese also included Berlin and West Berlin. Görlitz, formerly part of the Archdiocese of Breslau, was Archbishop Office, later Apostolic Administration.

The other areas were to dioceses canonically established on the territory of the Federal Republic of Germany. These were Episcopal office. An appreciation of apostolic administrations remained in contrary to the wishes of the East German government. Specifically, there was the Bishop's office Erfurt, Fulda, the Episcopal office in Magdeburg, in Paderborn, the Episcopal office Meiningen, at Würzburg, the Episcopal Commission for later Schwerin, to Osnabrück. Erfurt and Meiningen were performed in real-Union Episcopal Office Erfurt-Meiningen.
