= Rainer Woelki =

German Cardinal of the Catholic Church (born 1956)

His Eminence Rainer Maria Woelki
- Cardinal; Archbishop of Cologne
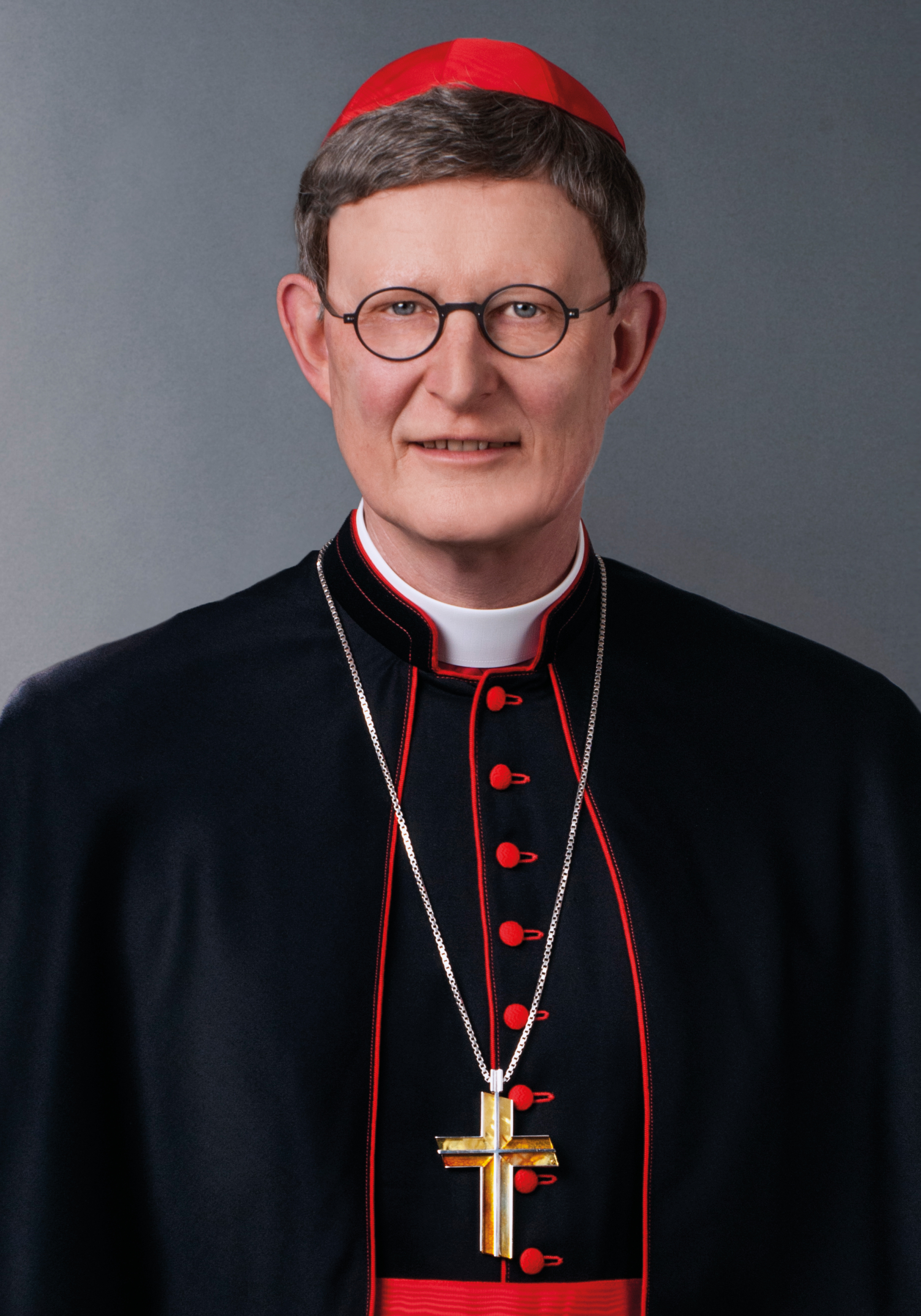
- Woelki in 2019
- Church: Roman Catholic Church
- Archdiocese: Cologne
- Province: Cologne
- Appointed: 11 July 2014
- Installed: 20 September 2014
- Predecessor: Joachim Meisner
- Other post: Cardinal-Priest of San Giovanni Maria Vianney (2012–)
- Previous posts: Archbishop of Berlin (2011–2014); Titular Bishop of Scampa (2003–2011); Auxiliary Bishop of Cologne (2003–2011)

Orders
- Ordination: 14 June 1985 by Joseph Höffner
- Consecration: 30 March 2003 by Joachim Meisner
- Created cardinal: 18 February 2012 by Pope Benedict XVI
- Rank: Cardinal-Priest

Personal details
- Born: Rainer Maria Woelki; 18 August 1956 (age 70) Köln-Mülheim, Cologne, North Rhine-Westphalia, West Germany
- Denomination: Roman Catholic
- Education: University of Bonn
- Motto: Nos sumus testes; (We are witnesses)
- Coat of arms: Rainer Maria Woelki's coat of arms

Styles of Rainer Woelki
- Reference style: His Eminence
- Spoken style: Your Eminence
- Religious style: Cardinal
- Posthumous style: n/a
- Informal style: Cardinal

Rainer Maria Woelki (German pronunciation: [ˈʁaɪnɐ maˈʁiːa ˈvœlki]; born 18 August 1956) is a German Catholic prelate who has served as Archbishop of Cologne since 2014. This came following his election by the Cathedral Chapter to succeed Joachim Meisner. He previously served as Archbishop of Berlin. He was made a cardinal in 2012.

== Earlier career ==
Woelki was born on 18 August 1956 in Cologne, one of three children of parents who had been expelled from East Prussia at the end of the Second World War. He studied philosophy and theology at the Theological Faculties of the universities of Bonn and Freiburg im Breisgau. On 14 June 1985 Cardinal Joseph Höffner ordained him a priest for the Archdiocese of Cologne.

From 1985 to 1989 he was assistant priest at St Mary's Parish in Neuss. In 1989, he served for a short time as military chaplain in Münster. In 1990, he became private secretary to the Archbishop of Cologne.

From 1997 to 2011, he was Director of the "Collegium Albertinum", a residence for major seminarians of the archdiocese studying at the University of Bonn. In 1999, Pope John Paul II named him a Chaplain of His Holiness, with the title of Monsignor. In 2000, he obtained a doctorate in theology, with a thesis on the ecclesiological role of the parish, from the Pontifical University of the Holy Cross.

On 24 February 2003, he was appointed Titular Bishop of Scampa and Auxiliary Bishop of the Archdiocese of Cologne by Pope John Paul II. He was consecrated on 30 March 2003 by Cardinal Joachim Meisner. He chose as his episcopal motto "Nos sumus testes" ("We are witnesses"), from Acts 5:32.

As auxiliary bishop, he was given responsibility for the north of the archdiocese, including the cities of Düsseldorf and Wuppertal, and was episcopal vicar for the doctrine of the faith and ecumenism, as well as being in charge of the permanent diaconate.

Within the German Bishops' Conference, he became a member of the Commission for Vocations and Ministries of the Church and for Science and Culture. He was also appointed a consultor of the Holy See's Congregation for Catholic Education.

== Archbishop of Berlin ==
On 2 July 2011, Pope Benedict XVI ratified Woelki's election by the cathedral chapter of Berlin and appointed him Archbishop of Berlin. The announcement came just two days after the death of Georg Cardinal Sterzinsky, whose resignation from the governance of the see had been accepted in February 2011.

Woelki has been criticised by some German politicians for his language on homosexuality, which has led them to question his suitability for the post of archbishop in a city with a significant gay population. In an interview with the Catholic journalist George Schwikart, he described homosexuality as an offence against the "order of creation".

After his appointment he said, "We will meet with each other" when asked about the city's active gay community. "I have respect and esteem for all people independent of heritage, skin colour and individual nature. I am open to all without reservations." "The Church is not a moral institution that goes around pointing its finger at people," Woelki said. "The Church is for me a community of seekers and believers and the Church would like to help people find their happiness in life."

He was installed as archbishop of Berlin and took formal possession of his see on 27 August 2011. One of Woelki's first tasks was to prepare for the arrival of Pope Benedict XVI in Berlin in September 2011 on his first state visit to Germany, his third visit to his home country since he was elected as Pope in 2005.

On 6 January 2012, the Vatican announced that Woelki would be created a cardinal on 18 February along with 21 others. He was created Cardinal-Priest of San Giovanni Maria Vianney, becoming the youngest member of the College of Cardinals, in succession to Reinhard Marx of Munich. However, within the same year the creation of Baselios Cleemis Thottunkal and Luis Antonio Tagle as cardinals in November 2012 made Woelki the third youngest cardinal.

With his elevation, Woelki became eligible to vote in future papal conclaves and will remain eligible to participate in any that begin before his 80th birthday on 18 August 2036. He was appointed a member of the Congregation for Catholic Education in addition to his duties in Berlin.

He participated as a cardinal elector in the 2013 papal conclave that elected Pope Francis and the 2025 papal conclave that elected Pope Leo XIV.

In a speech in June 2012 Woelki said "I believe we should agree and indeed we do agree on the fact that in judging this type of relation or relationship there is a big difference in judgement when people take responsibility for one another, when engaged in a long-term relationship as couples do in heterosexual relationships."

In October 2012 Woelki was nominated for a Respect Award by the Alliance Against Homophobia. He was praised by the group for speaking out in favour of a "new cooperation with homosexuals in society" and officially meeting the Association for Gays and Lesbians for talks. This, the alliance said, had "broken the tension between his Church and gays and lesbians and had laid the foundations for further exchange and for a constructive dialogue". He declined the nomination.

In December 2012 Woelki unveiled a reorganisation in a pastoral letter for Advent to 105 local parishes. Woelki said the archdiocese's finances had "stabilized and improved" thanks to "courageous and responsible decisions" and "great sacrifices" by church institutions. He added that the archdiocese was forecast to lose a further third of its membership by 2030, and he said Catholic schools, nurseries, hospitals, elderly homes and information centers would also be reorganised to reflect this shift.

== Archbishop of Cologne ==
On 11 July 2014 it was announced that Woelki would succeed Joachim Meisner as archbishop of Cologne. The announcement followed the completion of a complicated process that governs the determination of a new archbishop of Cologne and which requires several levels of ecclesiastical and civil review. Following Meisner's retirement, the archdiocesan cathedral chapter, which consists of the leading priests of the archdiocese, composed a list of candidates, which was passed to the pope via the papal nuncio in Berlin. He was installed in Cologne on 20 September.

The Holy See was entitled to amend the list of candidates before returning it to the cathedral chapter, which then elected from it the new archbishop. The ecclesiastical appointment had then to be further certified by the regional government in Düsseldorf. According to the terms of the concordat governing Catholic ecclesiastical affairs in the state of North Rhine-Westphalia, the regional parliament must certify that the newly nominated archbishop poses "no concerns of a political nature".

In October 2016 he was appointed a member of the Congregation for Divine Worship and the Discipline of the Sacraments by Pope Francis for a five-year renewable term.

In April 2018, Woelki led a group of seven bishops who appealed to the Vatican after Germany's bishops approved a proposal to allow Protestant spouses of Catholics to receive the Eucharist. The bishops argued that the German bishops did not have the authority to undertake such a measure. The proposal to expand Holy Communion was rejected on 25 May by Cardinal-elect Luis Ladaria Ferrer, Prefect of the Congregation for the Doctrine of the Faith, who said that there were "a series of problems of considerable importance".

In a February 2019 interview, Woelki criticized ideas that Church teaching can be changed in order to more closely align with the modern world, saying, "The Church stands for truths that transcend time." He renounced calls to abolish clerical celibacy and to ordain women.

Woelki expressed his thoughts again in an article the following month, in which he argued: "The Church cannot be bullied into changing her doctrine if change contradicts the spirit of the gospel." He continued:

All those inside and outside the Church who so vehemently push for changes (liberalizing celibacy, reconsidering homosexuality, ordaining women, accepting sex outside of marriage) have not answered one question: Why are Protestant Christians in Germany not flourishing? They have implemented all that is being demanded. Yet they are not in a better position—seen by their practice of faith, how few they recruit for pastoral ministry, and the number of people leaving their churches. Does that not indicate that the real problems lie elsewhere, and that the whole of Christianity has to confront a crisis of faith and understanding, rather than adapt to a "new reality of life" that is presented as irresistible?

Woelki wrote that he was not promoting "unreflective traditionalism" or the practice of "[circling] the wagons", but rather "growth and revitalization".

In 2023, Cardinal Woelki was one of four German bishops who voted against providing funding for the synod committee that is preparing to introduce a permanent German synodal council to oversee the Church.

== Handling of sexual child abuse cases ==
In 2011 a victim of child abuse was paid a large settlement based on the probable gravity of the case. In 2015 Woelki did not decide to reopen the case and notify Rome of it because of the "bad health of the priest" involved and because the "victim refused to offer testimony". According to Thomas Schüller, a professor for religious law but uninvolved in this case, the victim had credibly claimed that he wanted to testify. In December 2020, Schüller demanded Woelki resign for supposedly misrepresenting the victim's position.

Johannes-Wilhelm Rörig, appointed by the Federal Ministry of Family Affairs, Senior Citizens, Women and Youth to fight child abuse, made the criticism in 2020 that the Roman Catholic Archdiocese of Cologne, led by Woelki, was the only one that was not making progress although Woelki was the first bishop in Germany who had ordered an investigation on how the people responsible in the archdiocese had handled cases of child abuse. The review of cases between 1975 and 2018 concluded then there had been more than 200 child sexual abusers in the archdiocese and more than 300 victims, most of whom were less than 14 years old. Rörig criticised Woelki for ordering a second report on the handling of sexual abuse cases in the Archdiocese of Cologne but refusing to make the first public when it was finished. The Central Committee of German Catholics demanded on 20 October 2020 that the report be made public. The board of affected persons had agreed not to make the report public, but later on some of them claimed that they had been misinformed and that pressure had been put on them. Woelki justified his refusal to release the report by saying there had been problems in the methodology of its preparation, but did not specify what problems he was asserting had existed.

Woelki commissioned a second report, which was made public in March 2021. The first one can only be looked into on demand and under conditions. Both reports did not find fault with Woelki, but led him to suspend some diocesan officials and prompted Stefan Hesse, Archbishop of Hamburg, to offer his resignation because of actions he took while a senior official in Cologne.

On 23 March 2021, a week after the report's release, Woelki refused to resign, saying "Such a resignation would only be a short-lived symbol." and because the report didn't document any mistakes on his side. When Cardinal Reinhard Marx offered his resignation in June 2021, citing the sex abuse scandals, his action was seen as a criticism of Woelki's refusal to resign. After a review of the situation surrounding the reports, the Vatican concluded in June 2021 that Woelki had made "grave errors" regarding communication but said no evidence had been found that his actions were criminal under secular law. In September Woelki met with Pope Francis and offered his resignation, which the pope declined to accept, instead granting his request for a six-month leave for spiritual reflection.

In June 2021, the archdiocese under Woelki dismissed its legal counsel for taking her office chair home at the start of the COVID-19 pandemic. The counsel had to work through the files on the cases of sexual child abuse by priests of the archdiocese for years. The lawyer filed a lawsuit against the archdiocese and the Cologne Labor Court (Arbeitsgericht Köln) agreed with her; the termination is ineffective.

On 2 March 2022, Woelki again offered his resignation to the Pope.

== Publications ==
- Gott begleitet uns, with Joachim Opahle (Verlag Herder, 2015) ISBN 978-3-451-33737-6

Catholic Church titles
Preceded by Werner Thissen	— TITULAR — Titular Bishop of Scampa; 24 February 2003 – 2 July 2011	Succeeded by Anselm Umoren
Preceded by Georg Sterzinsky	Archbishop of Berlin; 2 July 2011 – 11 July 2014	Succeeded by Heiner Koch
Titular church established	Cardinal-Priest of San Giovanni Maria Vianney; 18 February 2012 –	Incumbent
Preceded by Joachim Meisner	Archbishop of Cologne; 11 July 2014 –	Incumbent
