= Josef Frings =

German clergyman and Cardinal

His Eminence Josef Richard Frings
- Cardinal, Archbishop of Cologne
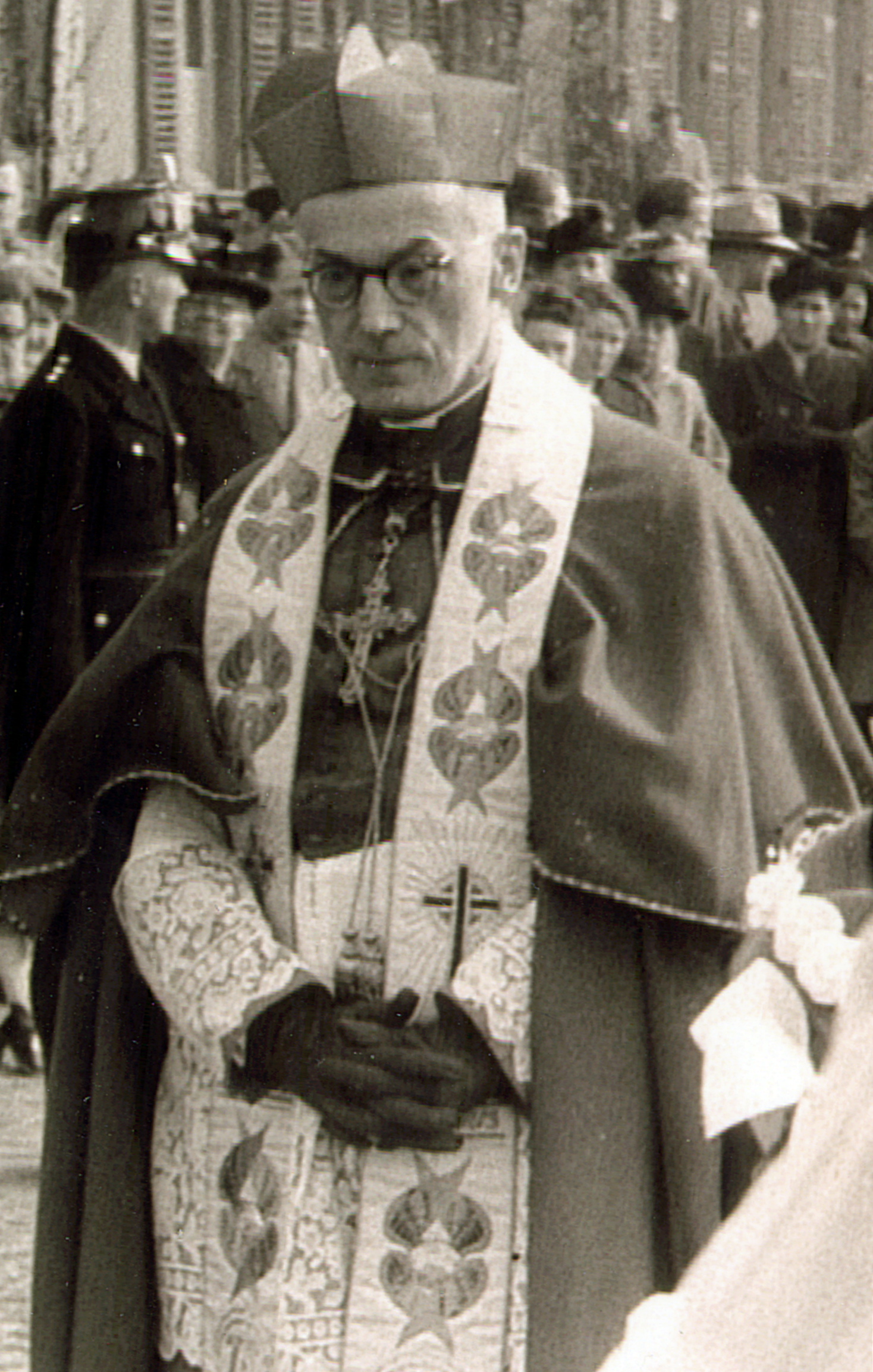
- Cardinal Joseph Frings in 1959.
- Church: Roman Catholic
- Archdiocese: Cologne
- Province: Cologne
- Diocese: Cologne
- Installed: 21 June 1942
- Term ended: 10 February 1969
- Predecessor: Karl Joseph Schulte
- Successor: Joseph Cardinal Höffner
- Other post: Cardinal-Priest of San Giovanni a Porta Latina

Orders
- Ordination: 10 August 1910 by Anton Hubert Fischer
- Consecration: 21 June 1942 by Cesare Orsenigo
- Created cardinal: 18 February 1946 by Pius XII

Personal details
- Born: Josef Richard Frings; 6 February 1887 Neuss, Kingdom of Prussia, German Empire
- Died: 17 December 1978 (aged 91) Cologne, West Germany
- Buried: Cologne Cathedral
- Denomination: Catholic
- Motto: Pro Hominibus Constitutus (Appointed for men)
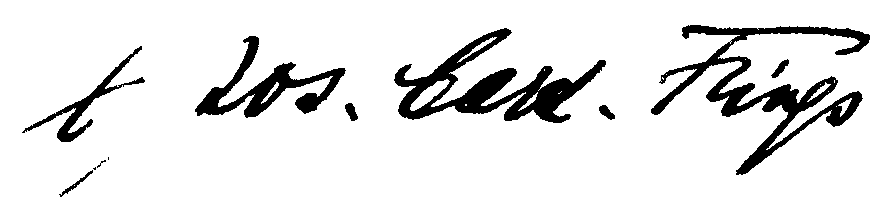
- Signature

- Coat of arms

Josef Richard Frings (6 February 1887 – 17 December 1978), was a German clergyman and Cardinal of the Catholic Church. He served as Archbishop of Cologne from 1942 to 1969. Considered a significant figure in Catholic resistance to Nazism, he was elevated to the cardinalate in 1946 by Pope Pius XII.

== Early life and ordination ==
Frings was born as the first of eight children of Heinrich, a weaving industrialist and manufacturer, and Maria (née Sels) Frings, in Neuss. He was baptised on 10 August 1887. After 1905 he studied Catholic theology in Munich, Innsbruck, Freiburg and Bonn. On 10 August 1910, he received his ordination to the priesthood.

At first he worked as a chaplain in Cologne-Zollstock until 1913, followed by a study visit in Rome until 1915. In 1916, he earned a doctorate in theology in Freiburg. From 1915 to 1922, he was pastor in Cologne-Fühlingen. Then, he worked as a principal of an orphanage in Neuss from 1922 to 1924. Until 1937, he was pastor in Cologne-Braunsfeld. Then, he led the archiepiscopal seminary in Bensberg.

According to Leni Riefenstahl, in her autobiography, Frings approached her on behalf of the Vatican to commission a pro-Catholic film. The Church had been impressed by her film The Blue Light, particularly with respect to its mystical elements. But Riefenstahl declined the offer on the same grounds she later used (unsuccessfully) with Adolf Hitler: that she would not accept a commission to make a film.

== Germany during the Third Reich ==
=== Archbishop of Cologne ===
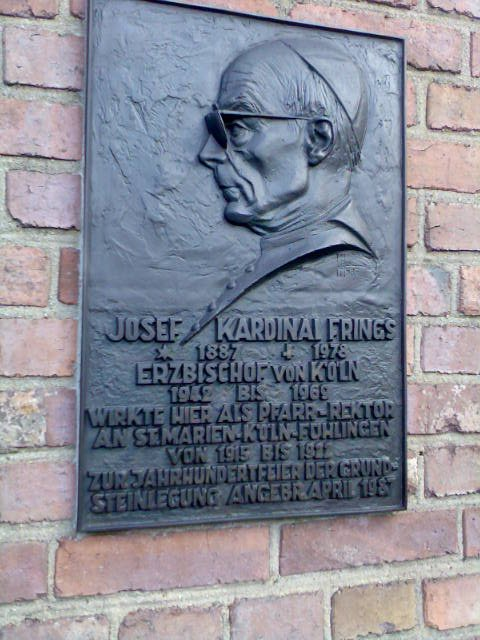
Memorial tablet for Frings at the parish church of Cologne-Fühlingen

On 1 May 1942 he was surprisingly named archbishop of Cologne, a post which he held until his resignation in 1969. Frings received his episcopal consecration from Archbishop Cesare Orsenigo, the Apostolic Nuncio to Germany, in Cologne Cathedral. The National Socialist regime had banned the German media from covering the consecration ceremonies; therefore, the citizens of Cologne started to publish small private advertisements to inform each other of the news.

However, the international press was allowed to report the consecration. The persecution of the Jews was described by Frings as himmelschreiendes Unrecht, 'injustice crying out to heaven'. His popularity saved him from reprisals more than once. Nevertheless, he was closely monitored by the Gestapo with the aid of several informers, including some clerics.

Frings's consecration was used as a demonstration of Catholic self-assertion. In his sermons, he repeatedly spoke in support of persecuted peoples and against state repression. In March 1944, Frings attacked arbitrary arrests, racial persecution and forced divorces. That autumn, he protested to the Gestapo against the deportations of Jews from Cologne and surrounds. In 1943, the German bishops had debated whether to confront Hitler directly and collectively over what they knew of the treatment of Jews. Frings wrote a pastoral letter cautioning his diocese not to violate the inherent rights of others to life, even those "not of our blood" and even during war, and preached in a sermon that "no one may take the property or life of an innocent person just because he is a member of a foreign race".

== Postwar ==
=== Cardinal ===
Frings, who had been a fierce and outspoken opponent of Hitler and Nazism during World War II, was, after the war, appointed head of the German Bishops' conference, and appointed a Cardinal. Against the declared neutrality of the clergy, as demanded by Rome, he joined the Christian Democratic Union (CDU). This step was a signal for many Rhenish Catholics (also clergymen), who before had a rather critical view of an interconfessional party, to support the CDU as well, instead of the Centre Party. Though Frings left the CDU a few months later because of pressure from Rome, his public partisanship is said to have been the start of the marginalising and gradual decline of the Catholic Centre Party.

During the military occupation of Germany, Frings became a staunch advocate on behalf for Nazi war criminals. He repeatedly protested war crimes trials, mainly the Dachau trials, as victors' justice. He sent a letter to military governor Lucius D. Clay, claiming that some of the convicted war criminals executed at Landsberg Prison by U.S. military occupation authorities were innocent. Frings spoke in favor for several war criminals, including field marshal Wilhelm List and the Krupps. Overall, it is said that Frings "strongly opposed the entire concept of bringing the perpetrators to justice."

His episcopal motto was Pro hominibus constitutus, Latin for "Appointed for the people". Frings was appointed Cardinal-Priest of San Giovanni a Porta Latina by Pope Pius XII in the consistory of 18 February 1946. From 1945 to 1965, he was chairman of the Conference of the German Bishops. In the year 1948 he was named as the "high protector" of refugee affairs.

Frings was an ardent supporter of the dogma of the Assumption of Mary, whose proclamation he personally attended 1 November 1950. Pope Pius XII credited him for participation and signing the related Apostolic Constitution Munificentissimus Deus. In 1954, Cardinal Frings initiated the diocesan godparenthood between the Archbishopric of Cologne and the Archdiocese of Tokyo, one of the first archdiocesan partnerships within the Catholic Church. In 1958 he was the initiator of the social relief organisation Misereor. The relief organisation Adveniat, founded in 1961, also started its work on his behalf.

Cardinal Frings is the only archbishop of Cologne who earned the honorary citizenship of Cologne, which happened in 1967. In the same year, he was also awarded the honorary citizenship of his native town Neuss. The street in Cologne in which the residence of the present Archbishops of Cologne is located was renamed Kardinal-Frings-Straße.

=== Second Vatican Council ===
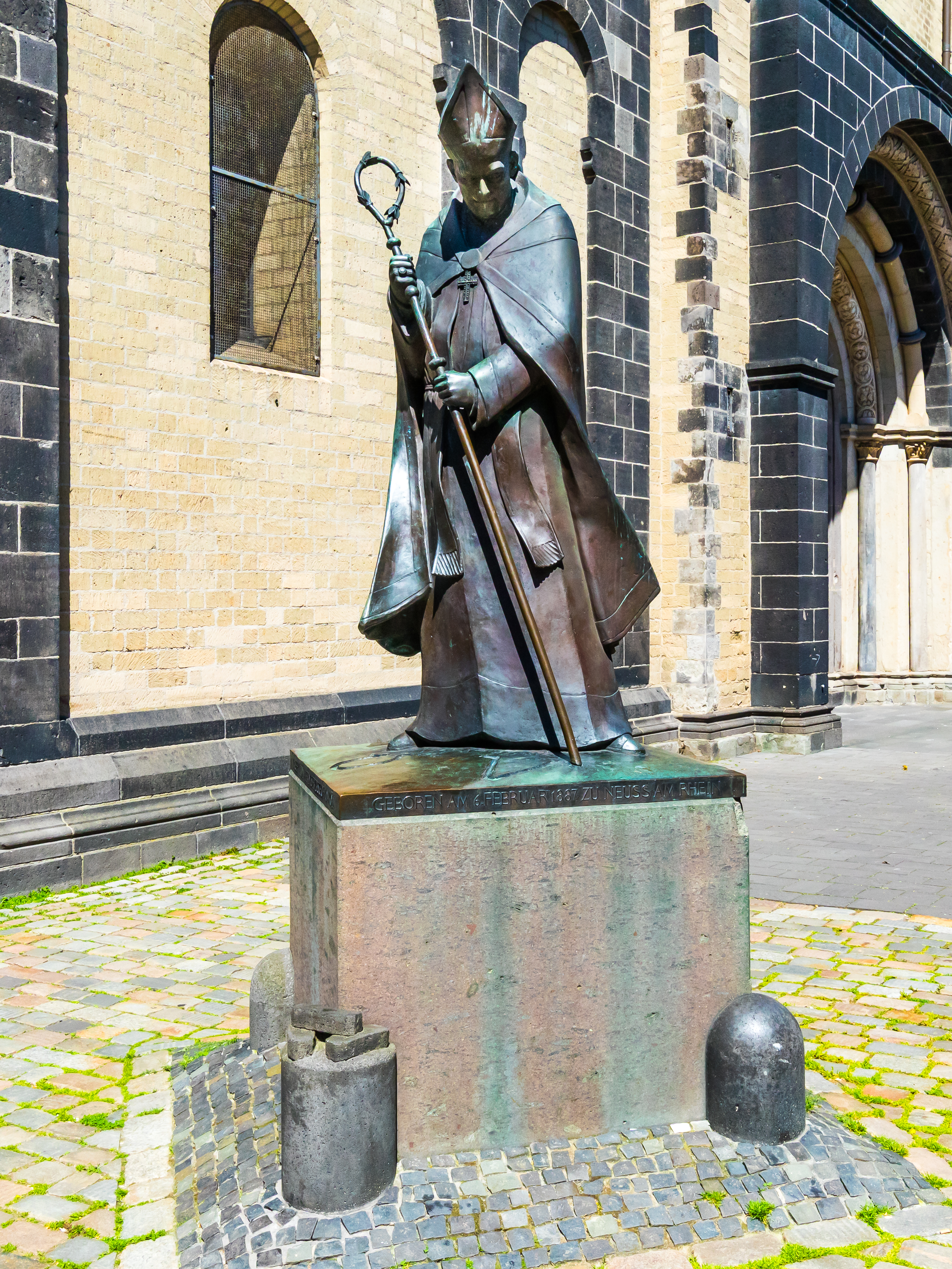
Cardinal Frings memorial in Neuss, Germany

In advance of the Second Vatican Council, Frings gave a speech in Genoa with the title: "Das Konzil auf dem Hintergrund der Zeitlage im Unterschied zum ersten vatikanischen Konzil" ("The council against the background of the present time in contrast to the First Vatican Council"). When Pope John XXIII later got hold of the text of the speech, he summoned Frings for an audience at the Vatican. Cardinal Frings, who was doubtful as to whether the pope liked his speech, said to his secretary, Dr Hubert Luthe, who would later become the bishop of Essen, in his humorous Kölsch dialect: "Hängen se m'r doch ens dat ruude Mäntelsche üm, wer weiß ob et nit dat letzte Mohl is" ("Please wrap the little red coat around my shoulders again, who knows if it will not be the last time you do it?"). However, the pope appeared enthusiastic when he read Frings' manuscript and gave him a warm welcome. It was recently discovered that the speech had been written by Frings' peritus (theological adviser), Joseph Ratzinger, the future Pope Benedict XVI.

Frings participated in the Second Vatican Council (1962–1965) and was a member of the ten-prelate council chair board. In his speech, delivered in fluent Latin, about the rules of procedure in the opening session of the council ("of the first general congregation), he demanded a time of "getting known to each other" of the council fathers before the act of deciding about the compilation of the council commissions and delayed execution of the plans developed by the curia. His speech, predominantly composed by Ratzinger, about the Holy Office, which the prelate perceived as too conservative and authoritarian, had tremendous effects and eventually led to its reorganisation as the Congregation for the Doctrine of the Faith.

=== Retirement and death ===
In 1963, Frings became philister of honour of the K.St.V. Arminia Bonn in the KV and on 3 May 1967 honorary member of the A.V. Rheinstein, a Catholic student fraternity that is a member of the Cartellverband der katholischen deutschen Studentenverbindungen.

In 1969, he resigned from the governance of his archdiocese for age reasons. He lost more and more of his eyesight and eventually was completely blind. As the result of rule changes by Pope Paul VI he lost, on 1 January 1971, the right to participate in a papal conclave due to being over the age of 80.

Frings died in 1978 from a heart attack in Cologne at 91. He was entombed in the archiepiscopal crypt in the Cologne Cathedral. His successor was Joseph Höffner.

== Legacy ==
On 8 December 1979, the archiepiscopal Gymnasium Beuel in Bonn, which was founded in 1964 by Frings, was named in Kardinal-Frings-Gymnasium. In 1996, the Kardinal-Frings-Association was founded in Frings' hometown of Neuss. The aim of the association is a scholarly study of the life and work of the Cardinal, and making the knowledge accessible to a broader public.

On 12 August 2000 a memorial of Frings was erected on behalf of the Cardinal Frings Association. It was inaugurated by the patron of the event, Cardinal Joachim Meisner, at the time Archbishop of Cologne. On 24 June 2006, the Südbrücke (south bridge) between Düsseldorf and Neuss was renamed Josef-Kardinal-Frings-Brücke.

=== "fringsen" ===
Cardinal Frings is eternalised in the Kölsch language with the word fringsen (pronounced [ˈfʁɪ̂ŋzə]), a verb literally translating as "to Frings" which became synonymous for "stealing food" and other low-value consumables out of need. The expression dates back on his New Year's Eve sermon which he held on 31 December 1946 in the St. Engelbert church in Cologne-Riehl, in which he referred to the looting of coal trains and the bad supply situation in the grim winter:

We live in times where the single individual, in his need, ought to be allowed to take what he needs to preserve his life and health, if he cannot obtain it through other means, work or begging.

Accordingly, the term "fringsen" refers to obtaining food and fuel for the winter among Cologne citizens. However, it is often overlooked that Cardinal Frings, in the very next sentence, also put the onus of returning the goods or repaying the original owner as soon as possible on whoever would appropriate consumables in this fashion:

But I think that in many cases, this was grossly overdone. And then there is only one way: Promptly return unlawful gains, or there will be no forgiveness with God.

== Works ==
- "Die Einheit der Messiasidee in den Evangelien. Ein Beitrag zur Theologie des Neuen Testaments", Mainz: Kirchheim, 1917. Zugl.: theol. Diss. Freiburg/Br. 1916
- "Grundsätze katholischer Soziallehre und zeitnaher Folgerungen", Köln 1947
- Verantwortung und Mitverantwortung in der Wirtschaft. Was sagt die katholische Soziallehre über Mitwirkung und Mitbestimmung?, Köln: Bachem, 1949.
- "Das Verhältnis der Kirche zu den Juden im Lichte des Zweiten Vatikanischen Konzils, Köln 1970
- "Für die Menschen bestellt. Erinnerungen des Alterzbischofs von Köln, Autobiographie, Köln: Bachem 1973

Catholic Church titles
Preceded by Adolf Bertram	Chairman of the Fulda Conference of Catholic Bishops; 1946–1965	Succeeded by Julius Döpfner
Preceded by Karl Joseph Schulte	Archbishop of Cologne; 1942–1969	Succeeded by Joseph II. Höffner
