= Institut für Staatskirchenrecht der Diözesen Deutschlands =

German think tank

The Institut für Staatskirchenrecht der Diözesen Deutschlands (Institute for Church–State Relations of the Dioceses in Germany) is a legal research institution of the Roman Catholic church based in Bonn, Germany. It was founded in 1970 by the German Bishops' Conference and is now run by the Association of German Dioceses.

== History ==
The Institute was founded in 1970 by the German Bishops' Conference under the auspices of the Roman Catholic Diocese of Essen. The founding director was the Jesuit Joseph List, supported by Heiner and Karl Eugen Schlief Marré. Since 1975, it has been run by the Association of German Dioceses (German: Verband der Diözesen Deutschlands, or VDD).

== Purpose ==
The purpose of the Institute is the academic study of the public law on state–church relations in theory and practice. In addition to providing legal advice to church organizations and providing information on legal developments in the field of state–church relations, the Institute is tasked with observing the development of the relationship between state, religion and the Church.

== Organization ==
The Institute is supported by a scientific advisory board that includes Josef Isensee (Chair) and Christian Starck.

== Directors ==
- Joseph Listl, SJ, 1971-1998
- Wolfgang Rüfner, 1998-2011
- Ansgar Hense, since 2011
