= Georg Sterzinsky =

German Roman Catholic Cardinal

His Eminence Georg Sterzinsky
- Cardinal, Archbishop of Berlin
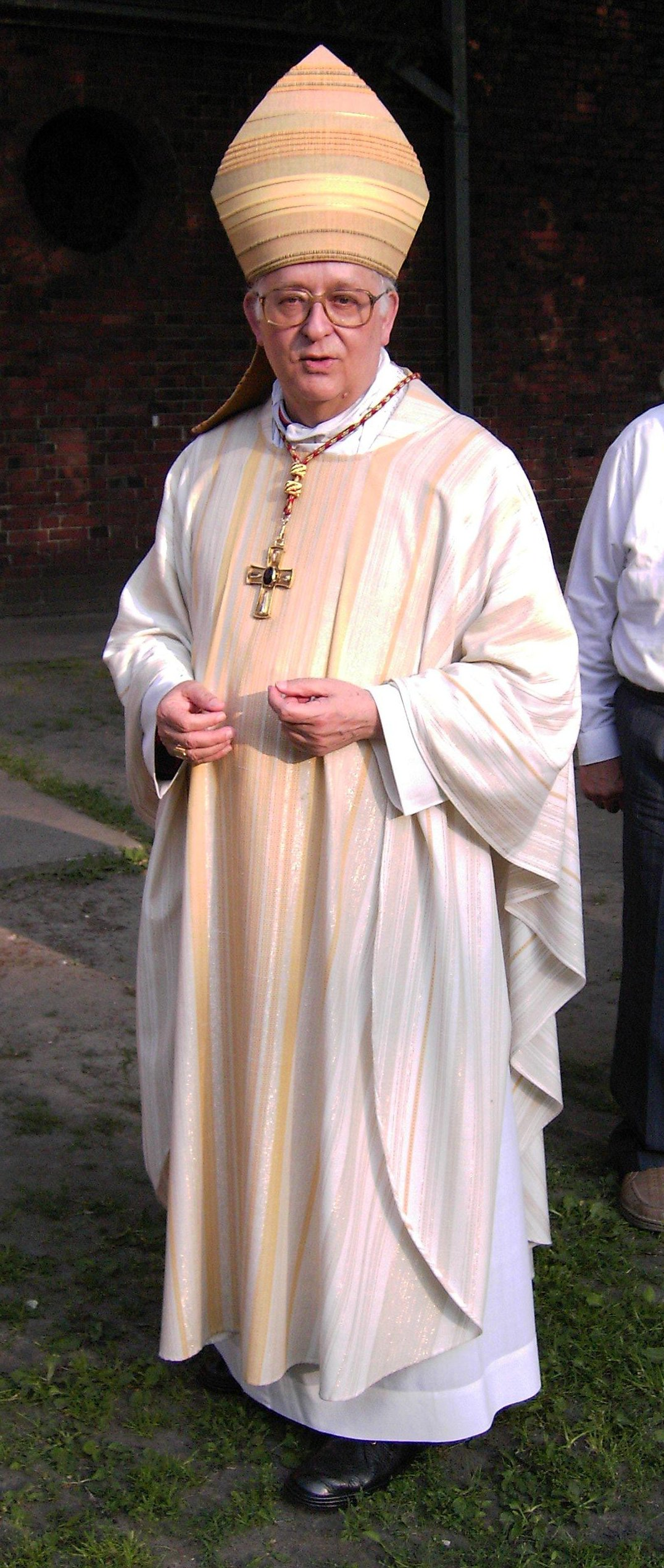
- Church: Roman Catholic
- Archdiocese: Berlin
- See: Berlin
- Installed: 9 September 1989
- Term ended: 24 February 2011
- Predecessor: Joachim Meisner
- Successor: Rainer Woelki
- Other post: Cardinal-Priest of San Giuseppe all'Aurelio

Orders
- Ordination: 29 June 1960 by Hugo Aufderbeck
- Consecration: 9 September 1989 by Joachim Wanke
- Created cardinal: 28 June 1991 by John Paul II
- Rank: Cardinal-Priest

Personal details
- Born: 9 February 1936 Warlack, East Prussia (Present day Poland)
- Died: 30 June 2011 (aged 75) Berlin, Germany
- Motto: Deus semper major ("God is always greater")
- Coat of arms

Styles of Georg Sterzinsky
- Reference style: His Eminence
- Spoken style: Your Eminence
- Religious style: Monsignor
- Informal style: Cardinal
- See: Berlin (emeritus)

Georg Maximilian Sterzinsky (9 February 1936 – 30 June 2011) was a German cardinal of the Catholic Church who served as Archbishop of Berlin until 2011.

== Life ==
Sterzinsky was born in Warlack (earlier also Wurlacken, Warlaucken, now Worławki, Olsztyn County), Landkreis Heilsberg, in German East Prussia. He lost his mother as a child and his family took refuge in Thuringia, due to the expulsions following the end of World War II; his homeland of Warmia is now within Poland. Sterzinsky grew up in the former GDR and lived there for most of his career.

=== Ordination ===
After beginning his studies in Catholic theology in 1954, Sterzinsky was ordained a deacon by Bishop Ferdinand Piontek on 15 November 1959, and ordained a priest on 29 June 1960, in Erfurt by Joseph Freusberg, Auxiliary Bishop of Fulda. Sterzinsky was then incardinated into the Diocese of Fulda. Subsequently, he served as chaplain in Eisenach until 1962, as prefect and assistant at the Erfurt Regional Seminary from 1962 to 1964, as vicar in Heiligenstadt from 1964 to 1966, and as parish priest in Jena from 1966 to 1981.

After serving as a parish priest for fifteen years, he became Vicar General to the Bishop of Erfurt in 1981. In 1989, Sterzinsky was appointed Bishop of Berlin and, in 1994, he became Archbishop when that see was raised to Archdiocese. Shortly after taking office in 1989, Sterzinsky faced the task, due to German reunification, of merging the Diocese of Berlin, which, in addition to the city of Berlin, encompassed parts of Brandenburg and Mecklenburg-Western Pomerania. In reorganizing what was then the second-largest diocese in Germany by area, Sterzinsky had to overcome not only the integration process but also significant financial challenges.

=== Cardinal ===
Sterzinsky was proclaimed Cardinal-Priest of San Giuseppe all'Aurelio on 28 June 1991. He was one of the cardinal electors who participated in the 2005 papal conclave that selected Pope Benedict XVI.

Pope Benedict XVI accepted Cardinal Sterzinsky's retirement as Metropolitan Archbishop of the Archdiocese of Berlin on 24 February 2011, for reasons of age (he had reached the age limit of 75) and health.

No successor was immediately named for Cardinal Sterzinsky upon his retirement, so the Archdiocese of Berlin was a vacant see (sede vacante) at the time. Auxiliary Bishop Matthias Heinrich was appointed apostolic administrator until a new archbishop was named.

In April 2011 Cardinal Sterzinsky was transferred to a rehabilitation clinic. In May 2011 it was reported that his condition was very serious after he developed pneumonia and had to be brought from the rehabilitation centre back to the hospital. Cardinal Sterzinsky died on 30 June. Pope Benedict XVI sent a telegram of condolence to Auxiliary Bishop Heinrich, expressing his closeness to the people of the Archdiocese and praising Sterzinsky's efforts in serving the people of Berlin during the fall of the Berlin Wall and the transition to a united Germany.

On 2 July 2011, two days after the Cardinal's death, Pope Benedict XVI, named Rainer Maria Woelki as the new Metropolitan Archbishop of Berlin. Woelki concelebrated in the Pontifical Mass at the funeral of his predecessor on 9 July in St. Hedwig's Cathedral, where Sterzinsky is buried in the crypt.

=== Views ===
Sterzinsky was particularly committed to migration and asylum policy and established the Subcommittee on Women in Church and Society within the German Bishops' Conference.

In November 2004, Sterzinsky argued in a sermon that protest of Catholics against state laws "that contradict God's law" may be necessary. This is the case, he said, "when attacks on human life at its beginning or end are permitted; when human embryos may be used like research material; when homosexual partnerships are equated with marriage."

In November 2008, following the murder of two Jesuits in Russia, Cardinal Sterzinsky called for a vigil in front of the Russian embassy and urged the government in Moscow to commit to a full investigation, to take action against defamatory reporting, and to send a clear signal of acceptance of Catholic Christians in Russia.

Catholic Church titles
Preceded by Joachim Meisner; 1988	Bishop, then Archbishop of Berlin; 1989–2011	Succeeded by Rainer Maria Woelki
Preceded by Joachim Wanke	Chairman of the Berlin Conference of Catholic Bishops; 1989–1990	Title extinct Members of Berlin Conference joined German Bishops' Conference
