= Gerhard Schaffran =

- Bishop of Dresden–Meissen
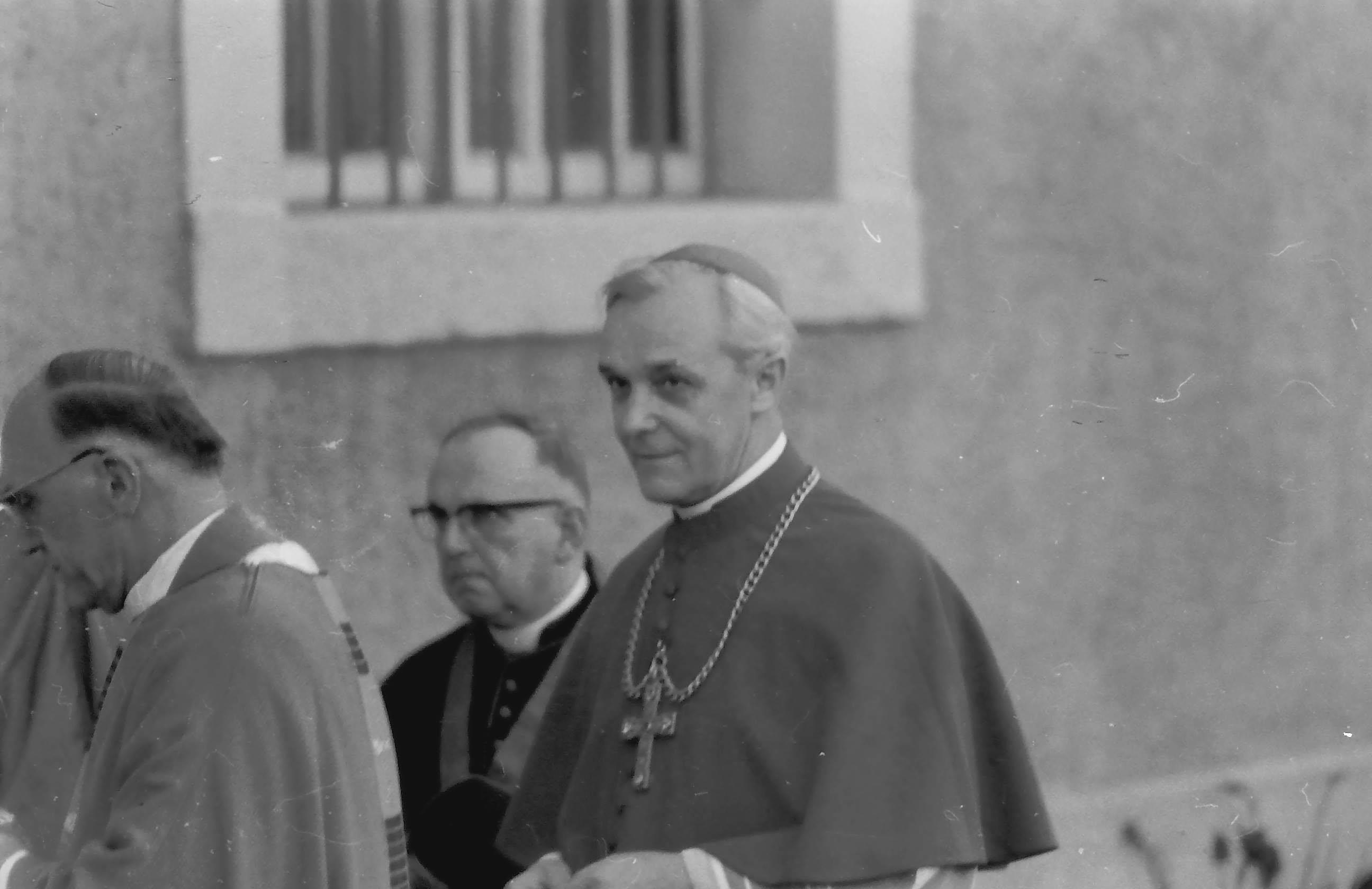
- Demand for new Bishop Schaffran in Chróścice (November 1970)
- Church: Catholic Church
- Diocese: Diocese of Dresden–Meissen
- In office: 12 September 1970 – 1 August 1987
- Predecessor: Otto Spülbeck
- Successor: Joachim Reinelt
- Previous posts: Titular Bishop of Semnea (1962-1970); Auxiliary Bishop of Görlitz (1962-1970)

Orders
- Ordination: 1 August 1937 by Adolf Bertram
- Consecration: 22 January 1963 by Alfred Bengsch

Personal details
- Born: 4 July 1912 Leschnitz, Province of Silesia, Kingdom of Prussia, German Empire
- Died: 4 March 1996 (aged 83) Dresden, Saxony, Germany
- Coat of arms

Gerhard Schaffran (4 July 1912, in Leśnica, Silesia – 4 March 1996, in Dresden) was Papal consistory and Auxiliary bishop of Görlitz, Capitulary vicar of Breslau for the see of Görlitz and Bishop of Dresden-Meissen.

== Life ==
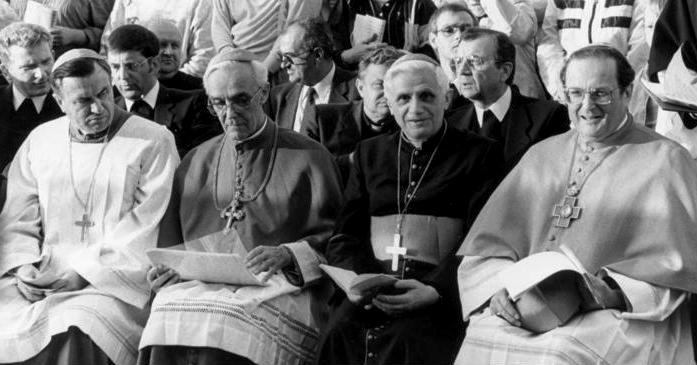
Bishop Karl Lehmann, Bishop Gerhard Schaffran, Cardinal Joseph Ratzinger and Cardinal Joachim Meisner

Schaffran was the son of a teacher, his family moved from Breslau to Leschnitz am Annaberg. In the First World War his father served as an officer and was killed. His widow lived with Gerhard and his siblings at Görlitz. Gerhard Schaffran initially studied at a gymnasium in Berlin, but left high school in Görlitz in order to study theology at Breslau. After his ordination by Adolf Bertram on 1 August 1937, Schaffran served as a chaplain in Breslau. During the Second World War he was a Military chaplain and then a voluntary chaplain in a Soviet prisoner of war camp in Azerbaijan. By the time of his release frontiers had moved and Breslau had become the Polish city of Wrocław. In 1949/50 Schaffran decided to move to the German Democratic Republic, where in 1952 he became rector of the catechist seminary in Görlitz. From 1959 he worked as Professor of Homiletics at the Catholic seminary in Neuzelle and as a prison chaplain. On 24 November 1962, Schaffran was appointed titular bishop of Semnea and Auxiliary bishop of Görlitz. He was ordained as a bishop on 22 January 1963 by Alfred Bengsch, Archbishop of Berlin. Auxiliary Bishop Friedrich Maria Rintelen of Magdeburg and Hugo Aufderbeck of Erfurt assisted in the consecration. Schaffran adopted Soli Deo (for God alone) as his motto.

In September 1970, Gerhard Schaffran was appointed Bishop of the diocese of Meißen, which became Dresden-Meissen in 1979 and whose seat was moved from Bautzen to Dresden in 1980. He remained in the role until 1987. From 1980 to 1982 he was chairman of the Berlin Conference of Bishops. A high point of his career was organising the only Catholic Conference in East Germany, which took place in Dresden from 10 to 12 July 1987.

On 1 August 1987, Pope John Paul II accepted his resignation on grounds of age. Schaffran died in 1996 in Dresden and was interred in the Bishops' crypt of Dresden Cathedral.

== Selected works ==
- Die Stifte Melk, Dürnstein, Göttweig, Klosterneuburg, Langewiesche 1958, with Gerhard Kerff.

== Bibliography ==
- Josef Pilvousek (2005). "Schaffran, Gerhard". Neue Deutsche Biographie (in German). Vol. 22. Berlin: Duncker & Humblot. pp. 540–541. (full text online).
- Bernd Schäfer: "Schaffran, Gerhard." In Wer war wer in der DDR? 5th Edition. Volume 2, Ch. Links, Berlin 2010, ISBN 978-3-86153-561-4.
- Marianne Seewald: Solo Dios basta. Gerhard Schaffran. Wegbegleiter in schweren Zeiten 1912–1962, St. Benno 2001 (Neuauflage 1996), ISBN 3746211352.
- Marianne Seewald: Soli Deo. Gerhard Schaffran. Bischofsjahre 1962–1996. Leipzig: St. Benno 2012, ISBN 3746234891.
- Martin Lätzel (2005). "Schaffran, Gerhard". In Bautz, Traugott (ed.). Biographisch-Bibliographisches Kirchenlexikon (BBKL) (in German). Vol. 25. Nordhausen: Bautz. cols. 1233–1234. ISBN 3-88309-332-7.

| Preceded by Otto Spülbeck | Bishop of Dresden-Meissen; 1970–1987 | Succeeded by Joachim (Friedrich) Reinelt |
| Preceded by Ferdinand (Nikolaus Andreas) Piontek | Capitulary vicar of the Archbishop of Breslau for Görlitz; 1963–1972 | Succeeded by None; Bernhard Huhn (Apostolic Administrator) |
