= San Giovanni Maria Vianney, Rome =

St. John Maria Vianney
- Chiesa di San Giovanni Maria Vianney (in Italian); Sancti Ioannis Mariæ Vianney (in Latin)
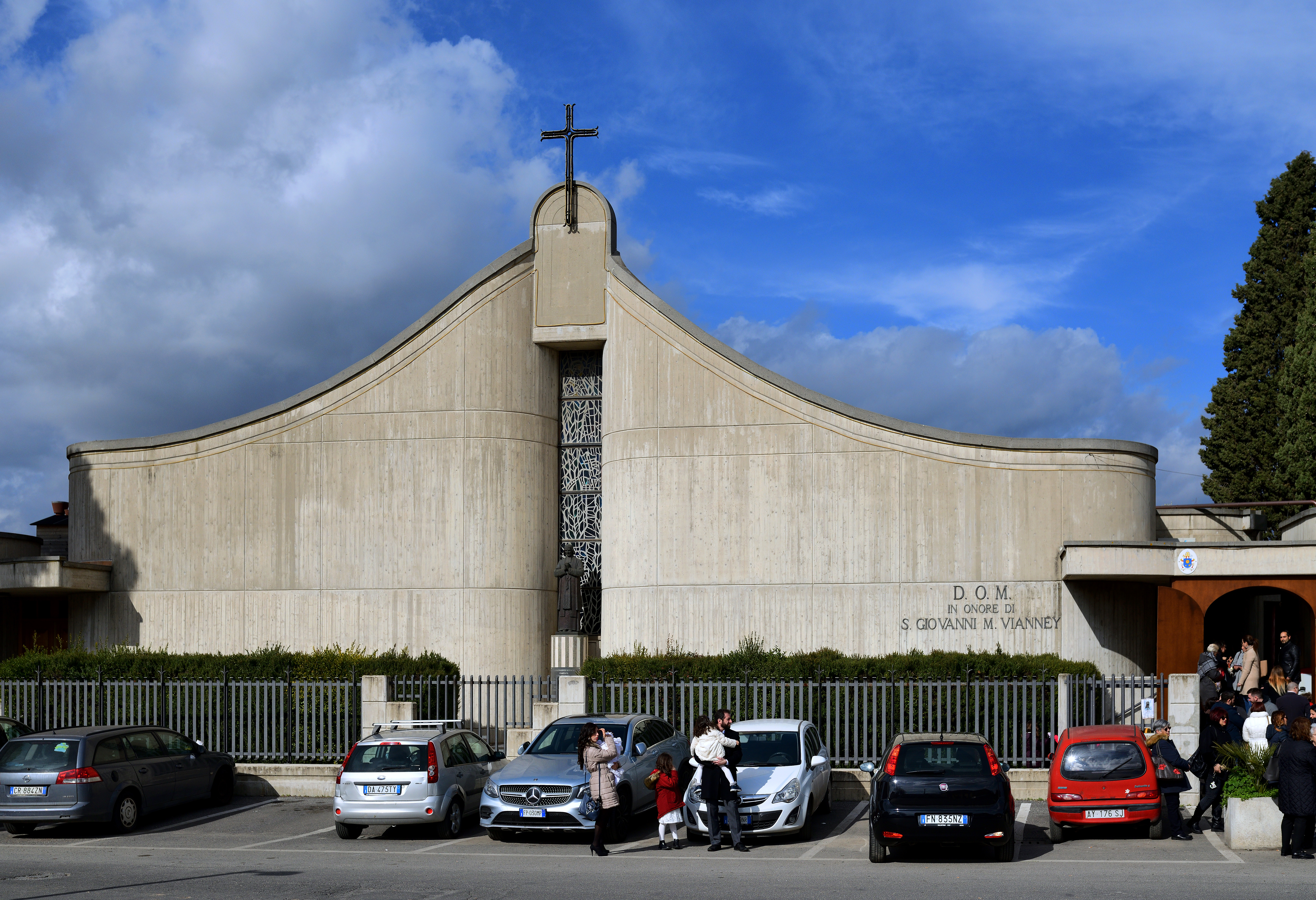
- Facade
- Click on the map for a fullscreen view
- 41°51′41″N 12°40′14″E
- Location: Via Lentini 6, Rome
- Country: Italy
- Denomination: Roman Catholic
- Tradition: Roman Rite
- Website: Official website

History
- Status: Titular church
- Dedication: John Vianney

Architecture
- Architectural type: Church
- Style: Modernist
- Groundbreaking: 1952

Administration
- District: Lazio
- Province: Rome

The church of San Giovanni Maria Vianney is a church in Rome, the Borghesiana area, wide Monreale. It was built in the eighties, in the place of an earlier church built above ground in 1952, and solemnly consecrated by Cardinal Ugo Poletti on 4 November 1990; It is dedicated to Saint John Mary Vianney, known simply as "the holy Cure of Ars", which was inspired of the Prado, priestly Association International which took charge of the parish in his first decades of life.

The church is home parish, erected on 26 July 1963, with the decree of the Cardinal Vicar Clemente Micara Quo efficacius, initially entrusted to the Institute of the Prado, then, since 1974, to the clergy of the Diocese of Treviso, and finally, since 1999, to the priests of the diocese of Rome. On 27 February 1983, the church was visited by Pope John Paul II. Currently the parish priest is Msgr. Marco Gandolfo.

In the consistory of 18 February 2012, it was instituted by Pope Benedict XVI the title of cardinal of St. John Mary Vianney. The current Cardinal Priest is Cardinal Rainer Woelki.

== List of Cardinal Protectors ==
- Rainer Maria Woelki (18 February 2012 – present)
