= Ulrich Neymeyr =

German Roman-Catholic bishop (born 1957)

- Bishop of Erfurt
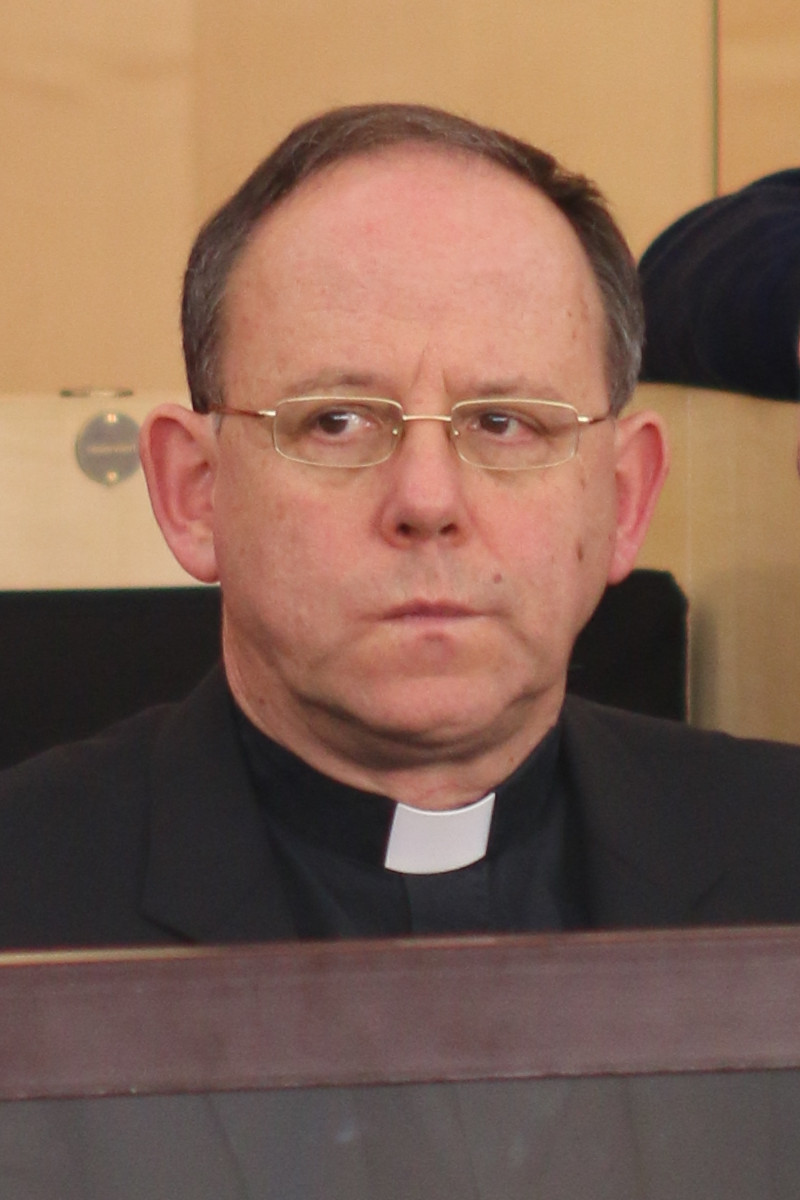
- Constituent meeting of the Hessian State Parliament 2014: Ulrich Neymeyr, Auxiliary Bishop of Mainz
- Church: Catholic Church
- Diocese: Diocese of Erfurt
- Appointed: 19 September 2014
- Predecessor: Joachim Wanke
- Previous posts: Titular Bishop of Maraguia (2003-2014); Auxiliary Bishop of Mainz (2003-2014)

Orders
- Ordination: 12 June 1982 by Hermann Volk
- Consecration: 21 April 2003 by Karl Lehmann

Personal details
- Born: 12 August 1957 (age 69) Worms-Herrnsheim (in northwest Worms), Rhineland-Palatinate, West Germany
- Motto: Christus Suscepit Nos

Ulrich Neymeyr (born 12 August 1957 in Worms-Herrnsheim) is a German Roman Catholic bishop.

== Life ==
In Mainz, Neymeyr studied Roman Catholic theology and philosophy at Johannes Gutenberg University Mainz. He became a priest on 12 June 1982. On 20 February 2003 Neymeyr was appointed auxiliary bishop of Mainz and became titular bishop of Maraguia. Since 22 November 2014 Neymeyr is bishop of the Diocese of Erfurt. He followed Erfurt bishop Joachim Wanke. In December 2018 and again in January 2020, Neymeyr supported married priests in Roman Catholic Church.
