= Julius August Döpfner =

Archbishop of Munich and Freising from 1961 to 1976

His Eminence Julius August Döpfner
- Archbishop of Munich and Freising
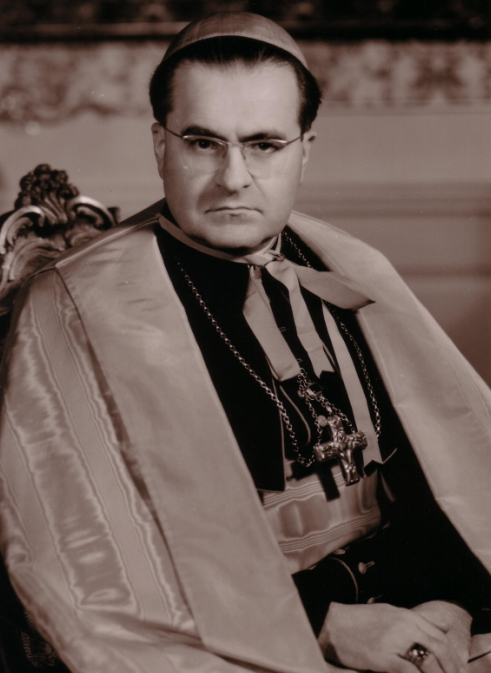
- Church: Catholic Church
- Archdiocese: Munich and Freising
- Appointed: 3 July 1961
- Installed: 30 September 1961
- Term ended: 24 July 1976
- Predecessor: Joseph Wendel
- Successor: Joseph Ratzinger
- Other post: Cardinal-Priest of Santa Maria della Scala
- Previous posts: Bishop of Würzburg (1948-1957); Bishop of Berlin (1957-1961)

Orders
- Ordination: 29 October 1939 by Luigi Traglia
- Consecration: 14 October 1948 by Joseph Otto Kolb
- Created cardinal: 15 December 1958 by John XXIII
- Rank: Cardinal-Priest

Personal details
- Born: 26 August 1913 Hausen, Bavaria, German Empire
- Died: 24 July 1976 (aged 62) Palais Holnstein, Munich, Bavaria, West Germany
- Buried: Munich Frauenkirche
- Denomination: Catholic Church
- Parents: Matthäus Döpfner; Maria Döpfner
- Education: Pontifical Gregorian University
- Motto: praedicamus crucifixum
- Coat of arms

Styles of Julius Döpfner
- Reference style: His Eminence
- Spoken style: Your Eminence
- Religious style: Cardinal
- Posthumous style: n/a
- Informal style: Cardinal
- See: Munich and Freising

Julius August Döpfner (26 August 1913 – 24 July 1976) was a German cardinal of the Catholic Church who was elevated to the cardinalate in 1958 and served as Archbishop of Munich and Freising from 1961 until his death.

== Biography ==
=== Early life and ordination ===
Julius Döpfner was born in Hausen (today a part of Bad Kissingen) to Julius Matthäus and Maria Döpfner. He was baptised two days later, on 28 August 1913. Döpfner had a sister, Maria, and two brothers, Paul and Otto. Entering the Augustinian-run gymnasium at Münnerstadt in 1924, he later attended the Seminary of Würzburg and the Pontifical German-Hungarian College in Rome. Döpfner was ordained to the priesthood by Archbishop Luigi Traglia on 29 October 1939, and then finished his studies at the Pontifical Gregorian University, from where he obtained a doctorate in theology in 1941, writing his dissertation on Cardinal John Henry Newman. He worked as a chaplain in Großwallstadt until 1944.

=== Bishop ===
On 11 August 1948, Döpfner was appointed Bishop of Würzburg by Pope Pius XII. He received his episcopal consecration on the following 14 October from Archbishop Joseph Kolb, with Bishops Joseph Schröffer and Arthur Landgraf serving as co-consecrators. The consecration took place in the Neumünster Collegiate church, Würzburg, as Würzburg Cathedral was unusable due to the bombing of Würzburg in World War II.

He was named Bishop of Berlin on 15 January 1957 and became the youngest member of the College of Cardinals when he was created Cardinal-Priest of Santa Maria della Scala (pro hac vice) by Pope John XXIII in the Consistory of 15 December 1958.

Promoted to Archbishop of Munich and Freising on 3 July 1961, Döpfner participated in the Second Vatican Council (1962–1965), and sat on its Board of Presidency. Along with Cardinal Raúl Silva Henríquez, he assisted Cardinal Léon-Etienne Duval in delivering one of the closing messages of the Council on 8 December 1965.

The German prelate was one of the cardinal electors in the 1963 papal conclave which selected Pope Paul VI.

From 1965 to 1976, Döpfner was Chairman of the Conference of the German Bishops and thus the spokesman of the Catholic Church in Germany. He was often described as papabile, but he died at age 62 in the archiepiscopal residence of Munich.

== Views ==
=== Church reform ===
The Cardinal, who was considered liberal in his positions, criticised the Church's "antiquated forms" and its "resisting ideas, forms and possibilities to which perhaps the future belongs, and we often consider as impossible that which will finally manifest itself as a legitimate form of Christianity".

=== Birth control ===
He was deeply involved with the question of birth control, serving as co-deputy on the Vatican's commission to study the topics of marriage, family, and regulation of birth.

=== Ecumenism ===
He also supported ecumenism.

Catholic Church titles
Preceded by Matthias Ehrenfried	Bishop of Würzburg; 1948–1957	Succeeded by Josef Stangl
Preceded by Wilhelm Weskamm	Bishop of Berlin; 1957–1961	Succeeded by Alfred Bengsch
Preceded by Joseph Wendel	Archbishop of Munich and Freising; 1961–1976	Succeeded by Joseph Ratzinger
Preceded by Josef Frings	Chairman of the Conference of the German Bishops; 1965–1976	Succeeded by Joseph Höffner
