= Joachim Meisner =

Catholic archbishop and cardinal

His Eminence Joachim Meisner
- Cardinal, Archbishop Emeritus of Cologne
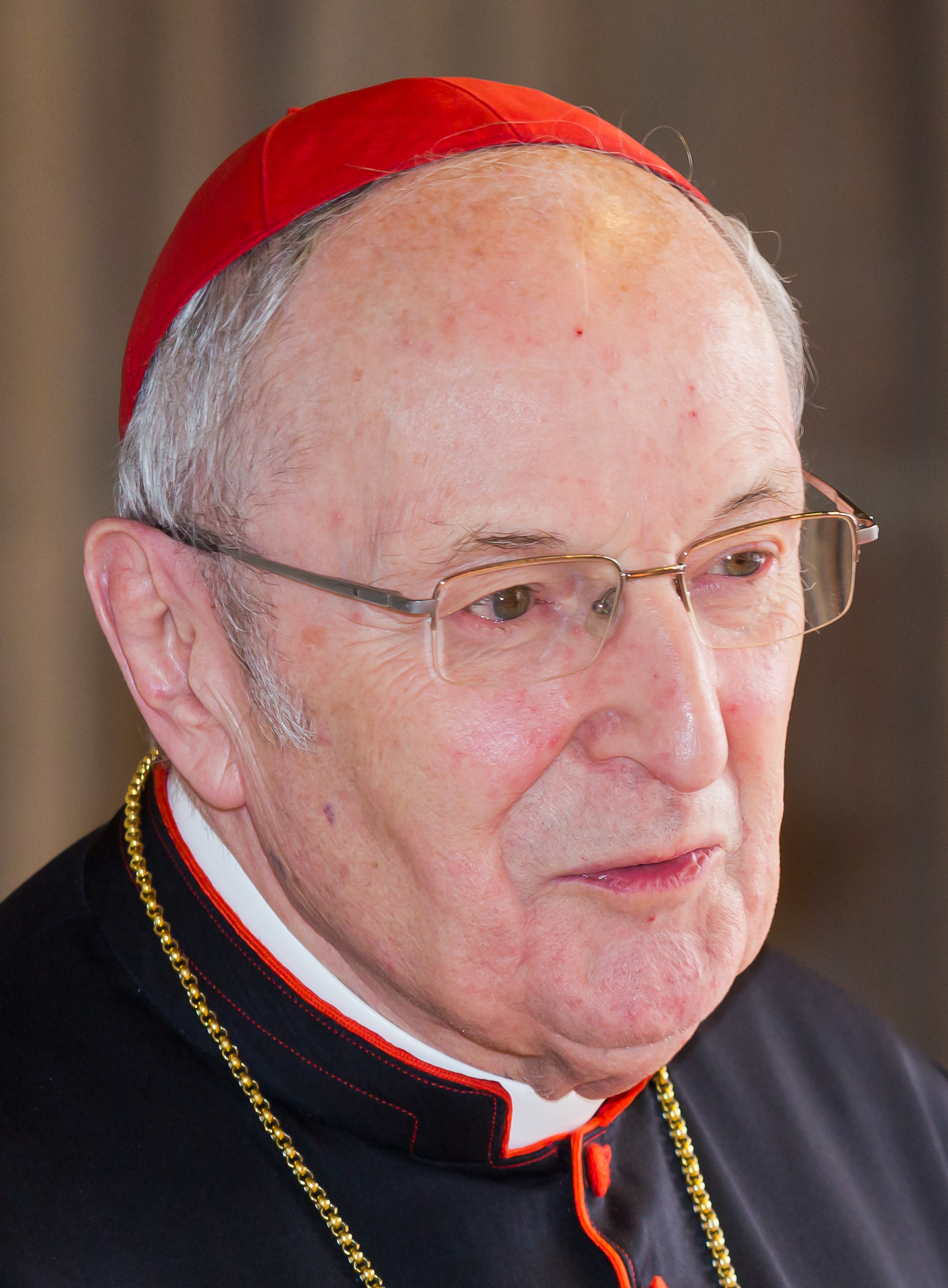
- Meisner in 2014
- Church: Cologne Cathedral
- Archdiocese: Cologne
- Province: Cologne
- Metropolis: Cologne
- See: Cologne
- Appointed: 20 December 1988
- Installed: 12 February 1989
- Term ended: 28 February 2014
- Predecessor: Joseph Höffner
- Successor: Rainer Woelki
- Other post: Cardinal-Priest of Santa Pudenziana (1983–2017)
- Previous posts: Auxiliary Bishop of Erfurt-Meiningen (1975–1980); Titular Bishop of Vina (1975–1980); Bishop of Berlin (1980–1988)

Orders
- Ordination: 22 December 1962 by Josef Freusberg
- Consecration: 17 May 1975 by Hugo Aufderbeck
- Created cardinal: 2 February 1983 by Pope John Paul II
- Rank: Cardinal-Priest

Personal details
- Born: 25 December 1933 Breslau, Lower Silesia, Prussia, Germany (now Wrocław, Poland)
- Died: 5 July 2017 (aged 83) Bad Füssing, Bavaria, Germany
- Denomination: Roman Catholic
- Motto: Spes Nostra Firma Est Pro Vobis; (That our hope for you may be steadfast)
- Coat of arms: Joachim Meisner's coat of arms

Styles of Joachim Meisner
- Reference style: His Eminence
- Spoken style: Your Eminence
- Religious style: Monsignor
- Informal style: Cardinal
- See: Cologne

Joachim Meisner (25 December 1933 – 5 July 2017) was a German Catholic prelate who served as Archbishop of Cologne from 1989 to 2014. He previously served as Bishop of Berlin from 1980 to 1989, and was created a cardinal in 1983. He was widely considered to be Germany's leading conservative Catholic figure.

== Early life and ordination ==
Meisner was born in Breslau, Germany (modern Wrocław, Poland). He studied in East Germany at the seminary of Erfurt from 1959 to 1962, and was ordained a deacon on 8 April 1962. On 22 December 1962, he was ordained to the priesthood by Bishop Josef Freusberg, an auxiliary bishop of the Diocese of Fulda.

Between 1963 and 1975, Meisner served as chaplain at St. Giles Parish in Heiligenstadt and Holy Cross Parish in Erfurt. He also served as diocesan director of Caritas. During his pastoral ministry, he studied at the Pontifical Gregorian University in Rome, earning his doctorate of theology in 1969.

== Bishop ==
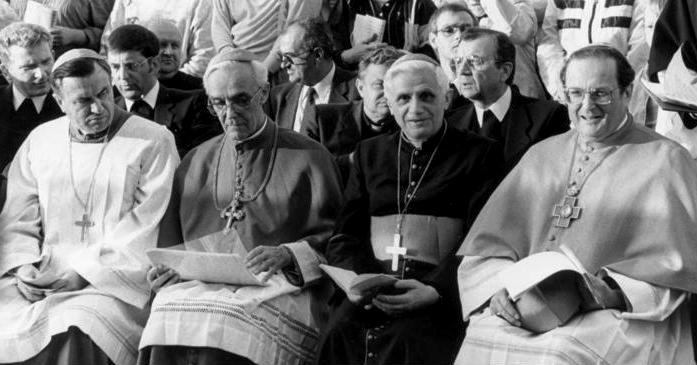
From left to right: Karl Lehmann, Gerhard Schaffran, Joseph Ratzinger (future pope), and Meisner in Dresden, 1987

In 1975, he was elected titular Bishop of Vina and auxiliary bishop to the Apostolic Administrator Erfurt-Meiningen. He was elected as a delegate to the Fourth Synod of Bishops at the Vatican in 1977, where he renewed a friendship with Karol Wojtyła, who in 1980 as Pope John Paul II appointed Meisner Bishop of Berlin and made him Cardinal-Priest of Santa Pudenziana in the consistory of 2 February 1983.

In 1988 after the death of Joseph Höffner, Meisner was named Archbishop of Cologne, a post he continued to hold until he retired. He was one of the cardinal electors who participated in the 2005 papal conclave that selected Pope Benedict XVI. Meisner was the bishop in charge for the XX. World Youth Day in August 2005 in the archdiocese in Cologne that attracted more than one million people.

On 18 September 2012, Meisner was appointed by Pope Benedict XVI as a Synod Father for the October 2012 Ordinary General Assembly of the Synod of Bishops.

In January 2013, two Catholic hospitals refused to provide a "morning after pill" to a rape victim based on Church policy that treats such medications as abortifacients. Meisner apologized and approved the use of some such pills for rape victims based on the belief that they prevented fertilization and did not induce abortion. He said that if "a medication that hinders conception is used after a rape with the purpose of avoiding fertilization, then this is acceptable in my view." The German Bishops' Conference endorsed his policy on 21 February, distinguishing between different types of morning after pills.

Meisner participated in the 2013 papal conclave that elected Pope Francis. At Pope Francis' inauguration, Meisner was one of the six cardinals who made the public act of obedience on behalf of the College of Cardinals. (Note: The other five cardinals were Giovanni Battista Re, Tarcisio Bertone, Jozef Tomko, Renato Raffaele Martino and Francesco Marchisano. Cardinals Re and Bertone represented the cardinal-bishops; Cardinals Martino and Marchisano represented the cardinal-deacons; and Cardinal Meisner himself along with Cardinal Tomko represented the cardinal priests.)

On 25 December 2013, Cardinal Meisner turned 80 and lost the right to participate in future conclaves and he submitted his resignation, which Pope Francis accepted on 28 February 2014. Diocesan administrator Stefan Heße led the archdiocese until a successor, Rainer Woelki, was appointed on 11 July and installed as Archbishop on 20 September 2014.

Meisner died on 5 July 2017 while vacationing in Bad Füssing in Bavaria.

In 2020, Cardinal Woelki accused Cardinal Meisner of covering up sexual abuse. Woelki said how “Serious mistakes were repeatedly made for decades”, Woelki said and how those responsible had behaved “completely irresponsibly”, and must therefore be “discovered and named”.

== Views ==
=== Papacy and Magisterium ===
Meisner was known for his support of the Pope and of the teachings of the Church. Pope John Paul II asked for Cardinal Meisner to see him when he was in the Gemelli Hospital in Rome. Meisner had a very close relationship to Pope John Paul II and was a long-time friend of Joseph Ratzinger, later Pope Benedict XVI.

He said that Benedict "has the intelligence of 12 professors and is as pious as a child on the day of his first Communion."

In 2009, Meisner "approached [Pope] Benedict on behalf of a number of cardinals to ask him to dump his Secretary of State, Italian Cardinal Tarcisio Bertone." "According to the interview in the Frankfurter Rundschau, Meisner told Benedict: 'Your Holiness, you have to make Cardinal Bertone resign! He has the responsibility, like in a secular government.' (Note: Heiliger Vater, Sie müssen Kardinal Bertone entlassen! Er ist der Verantwortliche – ähnlich wie der zuständige Minister in einer weltlichen Regierung.) According to Meisner, Benedict's response was: 'Listen to me carefully. Bertone will remain! Enough, enough, enough.'" (Note: Hör mir gut zu! Bertone bleibt! Basta! Basta! Basta!)

=== Culture and liturgy ===
"Wherever culture is separated from the worship of God, cult atrophies in ritualism and culture becomes degenerate", said Meisner at the blessing of his own archdiocese's new art museum, the Kolumba, on 14 September 2007. His choice of words recalled the phrase "entartete Kunst" ("degenerate art") used as the title of the exhibition opened by Adolf Hitler in Munich on 19 July 1937 and provoked strong negative reaction. (Note: Although the Cardinal said his meaning was "that when art and religion are separated, both are damaged", and a spokesman for him said he had not intended to pay tribute to "old ideologies", a writer for an Internet site that describes itself as "the Internet platform against extremism of the right" accused him of using Goebbels-like incendiary language against artists, in a cowardly attack by one who "has control over a huge and wealthy empire that includes property, church media and the allegiance of millions of believers" against those who "are vulnerable within society: generally isolated, badly paid and rarely organized into trade unions or powerful professional bodies".)

It was widely recognized that Meisner was criticizing the stained-glass window in Cologne Cathedral by Gerhard Richter, which was unveiled just weeks before and of which he disapproved.

=== Amoris laetitia ===
In April 2016, Pope Francis issued the apostolic exhortation Amoris laetitia. Meisner and three other cardinals (Carlo Caffarra, Walter Brandmüller and Raymond Leo Burke) submitted dubia (doubts) in private, followed by a public letter ("Seeking Clarity: A Plea to Untie the Knots in Amoris Laetitia") in November 2016, asking Francis to clarify various points of doctrine. The first dubia asked about the reception of the sacraments by the divorced and remarried. The public letter asked about fundamental issues of the Christian life and referenced Pope John Paul II's encyclical Veritatis splendor. In April 2017, following no reply to their letter, the cardinals requested a meeting with Francis, but there had been no response to this request by June 2017.

While waiting for a response from Francis, Pope Emeritus Benedict wrote a letter complimentary of Cardinal Meisner, in spite of the latter being "a fierce critic of Francis who spoke out against the pontiff allowing remarried divorcees to receive holy communion", according to The Guardian.

== Select published works ==
- Die Fürstin und der Kardinal: Ein Gespräch über Glauben und Tradition, with Princess Gloria of Thurn and Taxis (Verlag Herder, 2008) ISBN 9783451298714

== Notes ==
Catholic Church titles
Preceded by Joseph Höffner	Archbishop of Cologne; 1989–2014	Succeeded by Rainer Woelki
Preceded by Gerhard Schaffran	Chairman of the German Bishops' Conference; 1982–1988	Succeeded by Joachim Wanke
Preceded by Alfred Bengsch	Bishop of Berlin; 1980–1988	Succeeded by Georg Sterzinsky
