= Wilhelm Weskamm =

20th-century German Catholic bishop

His Excellency Wilhelm Weskamm
- Bishop of Berlin
- Diocese: Berlin
- Appointed: 4 June 1951
- Installed: 31 July 1951
- Term ended: August 21, 1956
- Predecessor: Konrad von Preysing
- Successor: Julius Döpfner
- Previous post: Titular bishop of Rhandus (1949-1951)

Orders
- Ordination: 3 April 1914
- Consecration: by Lorenz Jaeger

Personal details
- Born: Franz Johannes Wilhelm Weskamm; May 13, 1891
- Died: August 21, 1956 (aged 65) Berlin, Germany
- Buried: St. Hedwig's Cathedral, Berlin
- Coat of arms

Wilhelm Weskamm (13 May 1891 – 21 August 1956) was a German prelate of the Roman Catholic Church. He served as Bishop of Berlin from 1951 until his death.

== Life ==
Franz Johannes Wilhelm Weskamm was born in Helsen near Arolsen, roughly 175 km (110 miles) north of Frankfurt. Helsen was booming as a railway town, and Weskamm's father worked as a railway official. Weskamm undertook his secondary education at the Gymnasium Petrinum (school) at Brilon, passing his School final exams in 1909 and going on to study Theology at Paderborn. Still at Paderborn, he was ordained into the priesthood on 3 April 1914. He then became a chaplain at Daseburg, a quarter of Warburg. Between 1916 and 1919 he served as secretary to the Prisoners' of War Support Agency in Paderborn. In 1919 he was appointed a Cathedral Vicar ("Domvikar") at Paderborn where for the next thirteen years he worked as a chaplain.

Coat of arms as Auxiliary Bishop of Paderborn

In 1932 Weskamm relocated to Merseburg near Halle he became the priest in charge at Church of St Norbert. Having grown up and been educated in the Catholic western part of Germany, for the rest of his life he would be based in Germany's Lutheran heartland, and living after 1933 in a post democratic and increasingly secular version of the German state. In 1941 he was transferred from Merseburg, becoming a regional dean for Halle. In 1943 he was appointed priest with the title of "provost" at St, Sabastian's Cathedral in Magdeburg, and made the episcopal commissar for the Saxon (eastern) portion of the vast Archbishopric of Paderborn, at the same time appointed a non-resident canon of Paderborn, still based in Mageburg. In 1949 the pope appointed him to the titular episcopate of Rhandus, while he simultaneously became an Auxiliary bishop in the Paderborn diocese. He was consecrated by Archbishop Jaeger of Paderborn. 1949 was also the year in which Germany's postwar military occupation zones were replaced with two separate German states, and it was becoming apparent that for practical purposes administration of the part of the Paderborn arch-diocese in the former Soviet occupation zone - from now East Germany - from beyond the east-west divide would become increasingly difficult.

In June 1951, shortly after Weskamm's sixtieth birthday, he was appointed Bishop of Berlin in succession to Cardinal von Preysing who had died the previous year. Weskamm took the distinguished theologian Johannes Pinsk as advisor. His years as bishop were dominated by the need to establish training colleges for Catholic Theologians in East Germany, now increasingly isolated from the Catholic regions in western and southern Germany. Three major institutions set up during Weskamp's time were the pre-seminary at Schöneiche, the Norbertinum Seminary at Magdeburg and the Huysburg Pastoral Seminary. In 1954 Weskamm also launched the St. Hedwigsblatt Catholic journal in 1954. It lasted till 1990. Weskamm himself died in August 1956, however, a year after receiving an honorary doctorate from Halle University.

Weskamm's body was buried in the Old Cathedral Cemetery of St. Hedwig in Berlin's Liesenstraße. In 1968 his was one of the bodies relocated to the crypt of St. Hedwig's Cathedral, recently rebuilt following the war. There is also a street named after Bishop Weskamm in Berlin-Marienfelde.
