= Alfred Bengsch =

German Roman Catholic cardinal

His Eminence Alfred Bengsch
- Cardinal, Archbishop (personal title) of Berlin
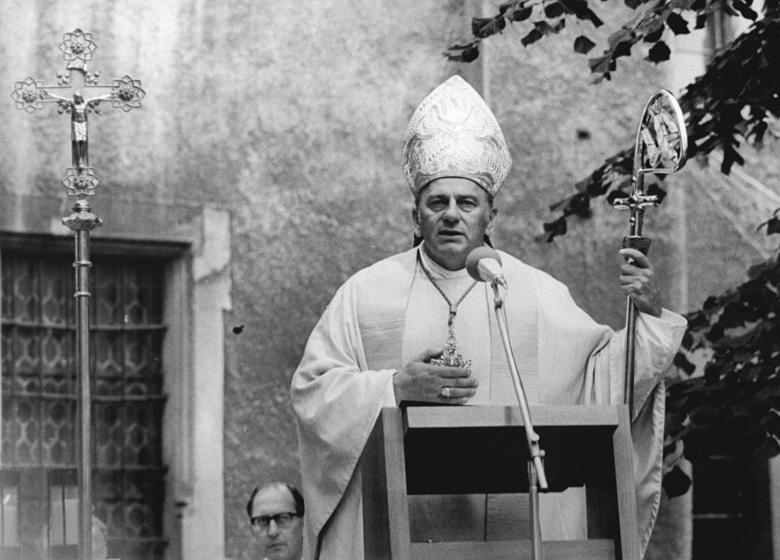
- Alfred Bengsch preaching in Worbis, 24 September 1978.
- Church: Roman Catholic
- Diocese: Berlin
- Installed: 16 August 1961
- Term ended: 13 December 1979
- Predecessor: Julius Döpfner
- Successor: Joachim Meisner
- Other post: Cardinal-deacon of San Filippo Neri in Eurosia

Orders
- Ordination: 2 April 1950 by Konrad von Preysing
- Consecration: 11 June 1959 by Julius Döpfner
- Created cardinal: 26 June 1967 by Paul VI
- Rank: Cardinal-deacon

Personal details
- Born: 10 September 1921 Berlin, Prussia; German Reich
- Died: 13 December 1979 (aged 58) East Berlin, East Germany
- Buried: St. Hedwig's Cathedral
- Denomination: Roman Catholic
- Coat of arms

Styles of Alfred Bengsch
- Reference style: His Eminence
- Spoken style: Your Eminence
- Informal style: Cardinal
- See: Berlin

Alfred Bengsch (10 September 1921 – 13 December 1979) was a German cardinal of the Roman Catholic Church. He served as Bishop of Berlin from 1961 until his death, and was elevated to the cardinalate in 1967.

== Biography ==
Alfred Bengsch was born in Berlin, and his father Leo was a postal worker. Entering a Jesuit Gymnasium in 1932, he later attended the Superior School of Philosophy and Theology in Fulda, and the seminary in Neuzelle. During World War II, Bengsch was drafted by the German Army; in the course of his service, he was wounded and captured by the United States Army in August 1944.

He was eventually ordained to the priesthood by Cardinal Konrad von Preysing on 2 April 1950. Bengsch then did pastoral work in Berlin until 1954, when he began teaching at the seminary in Erfurt, of which he was named regent on 1 April 1959. From 1956 to 1959, he also served as a professor at Neuzelle's seminary.

On 2 May 1959 Bengsch was appointed auxiliary bishop of Berlin and titular bishop of Tubia. He received his episcopal consecration on the following 11 June from Cardinal Julius Döpfner. Bengsch succeeded Döpfner as Bishop of Berlin on 16 August 1961, three days after the erection of the Berlin Wall. During his tenure in Berlin, he was given a monthly permission to cross the Berlin Wall to minister to the Eastern portion of his flock. The German prelate was granted the personal title of "archbishop" on 14 January 1962 and participated in the Second Vatican Council (1962–1965).

Viewed as a conservative, Bengsch did not involve himself in political affairs. He was created cardinal-priest of S. Filippo Neri in Eurosia by Pope Paul VI in the consistory of 26 June 1967. As Bengsch was the first East German to receive the red hat, this was seen as an act to better the Church's relations with East Germany. He was also the youngest prelate to be elevated at the ceremony. Berlin's bishop was one of the cardinal electors in the conclaves of August and October 1978.

Bengsch died in Berlin at age 58, and was buried at St. Hedwig's Cathedral.

Catholic Church titles
Preceded by Julius Döpfner	Bishop of Berlin; 1961–1979	Succeeded by Joachim Meisner
New title New Creation	Chairman of the Berlin Conference of Catholic Bishops; 1976–1979	Succeeded by Gerhard Schaffran
