= Konrad von Preysing =

German Roman Catholic cardinal (1880–1950)

His Eminence Konrad von Preysing
- Cardinal, Bishop of Berlin
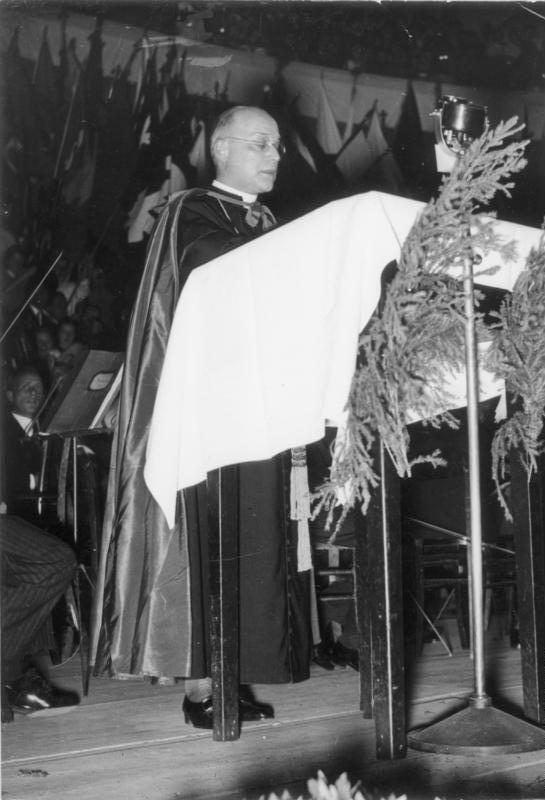
- Preysing in 1935
- See: Berlin
- Appointed: July 5, 1935
- Installed: August 31, 1935
- Term ended: December 21, 1950
- Predecessor: Nikolaus Bares
- Successor: Wilhelm Weskamm
- Other post: Cardinal Priest of S. Agata de' Goti
- Previous post: Bishop of Eichstätt (1932-1935)

Orders
- Ordination: July 29, 1912
- Consecration: October 28, 1932 by Jacobus von Hauck
- Created cardinal: February 18, 1946 by Pius XII
- Rank: Cardinal Priest

Personal details
- Born: Johann Konrad Maria Augustin Felix, Graf von Preysing Lichtenegg-Moos; August 30, 1880 Kronwinkel, German Empire
- Died: December 21, 1950 (aged 70) East Berlin, East Germany
- Buried: St. Hedwig's Cathedral, Berlin
- Coat of arms

Styles of Konrad von Preysing
- Reference style: His Eminence
- Spoken style: Your Eminence
- Informal style: Cardinal
- See: Berlin

Johann Konrad Maria Augustin Felix, Graf von Preysing Lichtenegg-Moos (30 August 1880 – 21 December 1950) was a German prelate of the Roman Catholic Church. Considered a significant figure in Catholic resistance to Nazism, he served as Bishop of Berlin from 1935 until his death, and was elevated to the cardinalate in 1946 by Pope Pius XII.

== Early life and ordination ==
Preysing was born at the castle of Kronwinkel, near Landshut, to the nobles Kaspar von Preysing and his wife, Hedwig von Walterskirchen. His brothers, Albert and Joseph, also became priests.

Konrad von Preysing attended a Landshut gymnasium before entering the Ludwig-Maximilians-Universität München in 1898. After studying at the University of Würzburg from 1901 to 1902, he forfeited a diplomatic career for an ecclesiastical one. He then obtained his doctorate in theology in 1913 from the Theological Faculty of Innsbruck, which he had entered in 1908. Preysing was ordained to the priesthood on 29 July 1912.

=== Secretary to the Cardinal ===
Preysing served as private secretary to Cardinal Franziskus von Bettinger, the Archbishop of Munich and Freising, until 1916. As the Cardinal's secretary, he attended the 1914 papal conclave that elected Pope Benedict XV. Preysing did pastoral work in the Archdiocese of Munich and Freising from 1916 to 1932. He was made a canon of the cathedral chapter on 1 April 1928, and an Honorary Chamberlain of His Holiness on 15 May 1914.

== Nazi period ==
=== Bishop ===
Coat of arms as bishop of Eichstätt

On 9 September 1932, Preysing was appointed Bishop of Eichstätt by Pope Pius XI. He received his episcopal consecration on the following October 28 from Archbishop Jacobus von Hauck, with Bishops Matthias Ehrenfried and Sigmund Ow-Felldorf serving as co-consecrators, at Eichstätt. He was later named Bishop of Berlin on 5 July 1935, and installed on 31 August.

=== Resistance to Nazism ===
In 1933, Adolf Hitler was appointed Chancellor of Germany. A stern opponent of the Nazi regime, Preysing said "We have fallen into the hands of criminals and fools" when the party came to power.

Preysing was one of the most firm and consistent of senior Catholics to oppose the Nazis, and was loathed by Hitler, who said "the foulest of carrion are those who come clothed in the cloak of humility and the foulest of these Count Preysing! What a beast!".

Preysing opposed the appeasement attitudes of Cardinal Adolf Bertram towards the Nazis. He spoke out in public sermons and argued the case for firm opposition at bishops' conferences. He sought to block the Nazi closure of Catholic schools and arrests of church officials. By early 1937, the church hierarchy in Germany, which had initially attempted to co-operate with the new government, had become highly disillusioned. In March, Pope Pius XI issued the Mit brennender Sorge ("With burning concern") encyclical. The Pope asserted the inviolability of human rights and expressed deep concern at the Nazi regime's flouting of the 1933 Reich concordat, its mistreatment of Catholics and abuse of Christian values.

The pope accused the government of "systematic hostility levelled at the Church" and of sowing "secret and open fundamental hostility to Christ and His Church". Preysing was part of the five-member commission that prepared the anti-Nazi encyclical.

In 1938, Preysing became one of the co-founders of the Hilfswerk beim Bischöflichen Ordinariat Berlin (Welfare Office of the Berlin Diocese Office). He extended care to both baptised and unbaptised Jews and protested the Nazi euthanasia programme. In 1940, Preysing ordered that prayers be offered in all of his diocese's churches for thirty Confessing Church clerics who were arrested in Prussia.

While Preysing was protected from Nazi retaliation by his position, his cathedral administrator and confidant Bernard Lichtenberg, was not. Lichtenberg served at St. Hedwig's Cathedral from 1932, and was under the watch of the Gestapo by 1933, for his support of prisoners and Jews. He became a confidante of Bishop von Preysing from 1935. He ran Preysing's aid unit, the Hilfswerke beim Bischöflichen Ordinariat Berlin, which secretly gave assistance to those who were being persecuted by the regime. From 1938, Lichtenberg conducted prayers for the Jews and other inmates of the concentration camps, including "my fellow priests there". For preaching against Nazi propaganda and writing a letter of protest concerning Nazi euthanasia, he was arrested in 1941, sentenced to two years penal servitude, and died en route to Dachau Concentration Camp in 1943.

Following Lichtenberg's arrest, Margarete Sommer reported to Preysing. While working for the Welfare Office, Sommer coordinated Catholic aid for victims of racial persecution – giving spiritual comfort, food, clothing, and money. She gathered intelligence on the deportations of the Jews, and living conditions in concentration camps, as well as on SS firing squads, writing several reports on these topics from 1942.

A January 1941 letter from Preysing to Pope Pius XII indicated that he was aware of the dire situation of European Jews and that he had been seeking help from the Holy See on the question. In a sermon in March 1941, Preysing reaffirmed Pius XII's opposition to the killing of the sick or otherwise infirm on either economic or eugenical grounds.

Preysing also worked with leading members of the resistance Carl Goerdeler and Helmuth James Graf von Moltke. Preysing's Advent Pastoral Letters of 1942 and 1943 on the nature of human rights reflected the anti-Nazi theology of the Barmen Declaration of the Confessing Church, leading one to be broadcast in German by the BBC. Preysing had contact with the Kreisau Circle German Resistance group. Preysing later admitted that Hans Globke had become an official of the Interior Ministry through the German episcopate in order to serve as an agent for the German Resistance. In 1944, Preysing met with and gave a blessing to Claus von Stauffenberg, in the lead up to the July Plot to assassinate Hitler, and spoke with the resistance leader on whether the need for radical change could justify tyrannicide. Despite Preysing's open opposition, the Nazis did not dare arrest him and several months after the end of the war he was named a cardinal by Pope Pius XII.

== Post-war period ==
=== Cardinal ===
Pope Pius XII created Preysing Cardinal Priest of S. Agata de' Goti in the consistory of 18 February 1946; Angelo Roncalli, the nuncio to France and also the future Pope John XXIII, provided Preysing with the money for the trip to Rome. At the ceremony, when another new cardinal remarked that their red hats would be suspended in their cathedrals following their deaths, Preysing responded, "Your Eminence forgets that I have no roof", as St. Hedwig's Cathedral had been bombed during World War II.

=== Anti-Communist ===
Preysing denounced the East German Communist National Front, which subsequently called him a "gladiator for American imperialism".

=== Death ===
Preysing died in East Berlin at age 70. He was buried in St. Hedwig's cemetery on 28 December 1950, but his remains were later transferred to the crypt of St. Hedwig's Cathedral on 12 February 1968.

Catholic Church titles
| Preceded by Johannes von Mergel, OSB | Bishop of Eichstätt; 1932–1935 | Succeeded by Michael Rackl |
| Preceded by Nikolaus Bares | Bishop of Berlin; 1935–1950 | Succeeded by Wilhelm Weskamm |
