= Diocese of Erfurt =

Catholic diocese in Germany

Coordinates: 50.9758°N 11.0233°E

Diocese of Erfurt Dioecesis Erfordiensis Bistum Erfurt

Catholic
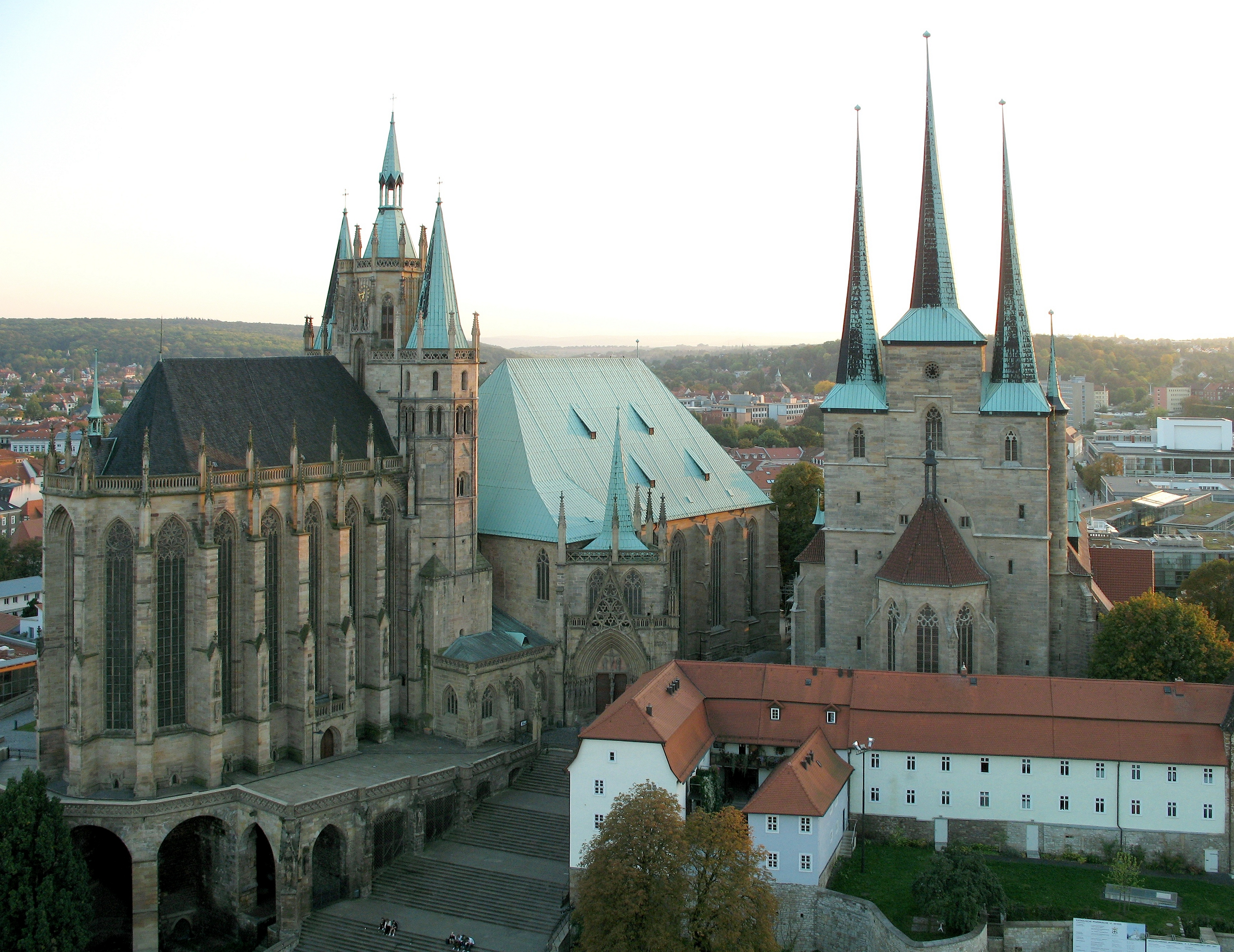
- Erfurt Cathedral

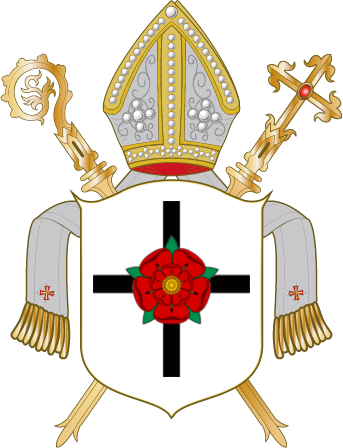
- Coat of arms

Location
- Country: {Germany
- Territory: Erfurt, Thuringia
- Ecclesiastical province: Paderborn
- Metropolitan: Archdiocese of Paderborn

Statistics
- Area: 12,000 km^{2} (4,600 sq mi)
- Population: Total; Catholics: (as of 2013); 2,188,589; 152,282 (7%)

Information
- Denomination: Roman Catholic
- Rite: Roman Rite
- Established: 27 June 1994
- Cathedral: Erfurt Cathedral
- Patron saint: St. Elisabeth of Thuringia

Current leadership
- Pope: Leo XIV
- Bishop: Ulrich Neymeyr
- Metropolitan Archbishop: Hans-Josef Becker; Archbishop of Paderborn
- Auxiliary Bishops: Reinhard Hauke

Map
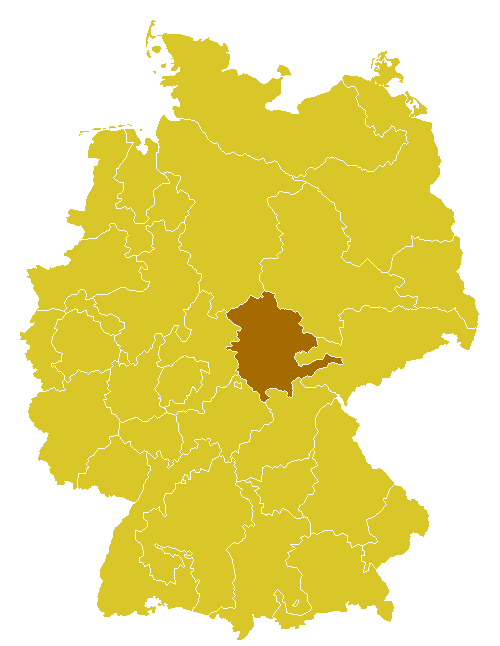

Website
- bistum-erfurt.de

The Diocese of Erfurt (Latin: Dioecesis Erfordiensis) is a Latin Church diocese of the Catholic church in Germany. The diocese was created in 1973 as the apostolic administration of Erfurt-Meiningen, and was elevated in 1994 to the current diocese of Erfurt. The diocese is a suffragan of the Archdiocese of Paderborn.

After the former bishop Joachim Wanke resigned in 2012 the diocese was without bishop until November 2014 when Ulrich Neymeyr took office. Neymeyr served as auxiliary bishop in the Diocese of Mainz before being appointed bishop of Erfurt.

== Ordinaries ==
- Hugo Aufderbeck (23 July 1973 Appointed – 17 January 1981 Died)
- Joachim Wanke (17 January 1981 Succeeded – 1 October 2012 Retired)
- Ulrich Neymeyr (19 September 2014 – present)
