= Joachim Wanke =

German Roman Catholic bishop (1941–2026)

The Most Reverend Joachim Wanke
- Bishop Emeritus of Erfurt
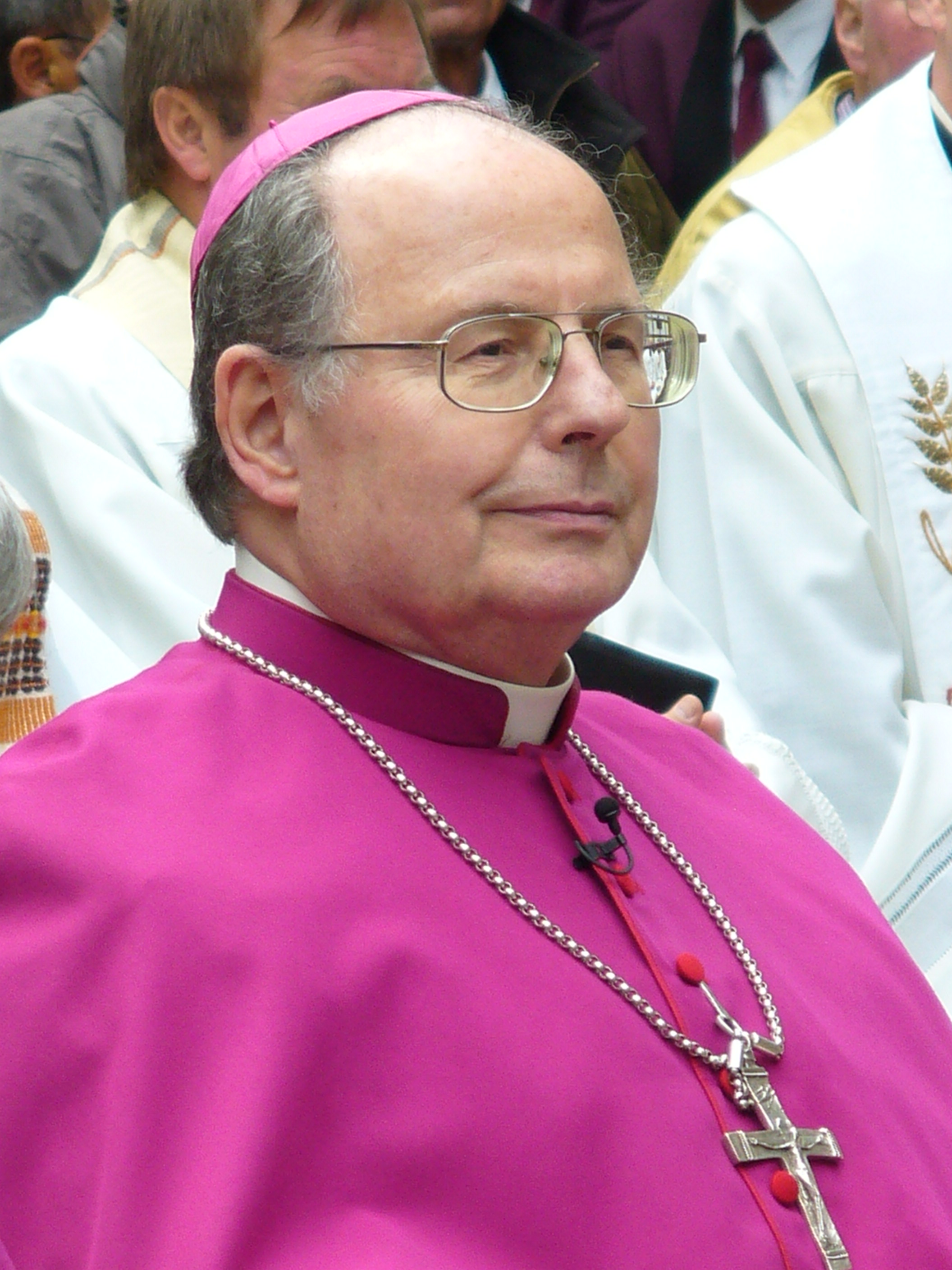
- Church: Roman Catholic Church
- Archdiocese: Paderborn
- Diocese: Erfurt
- Appointed: 8 July 1994
- Term ended: 1 October 2012
- Predecessor: Hugo Aufderbeck
- Successor: Ulrich Neymeyr
- Previous posts: Titular Bishop of Castellum in Mauretania (1980–1994); Auxiliary Bishop of Erfurt-Meiningen (1980); Coadjutor Apostolic Administrator of Erfurt-Meiningen (1980–1981); Apostolic Administrator of Erfurt-Meiningen (1981–1994)

Orders
- Ordination: 26 June 1966 by Hugo Aufderbeck
- Consecration: 26 November 1980 by Joachim Meisner, Bernhard Huhn and Georg Weinhold

Personal details
- Born: 4 May 1941 Breslau, Gau Lower Silesia, Germany (now Wrocław, Poland)
- Died: 12 March 2026 (aged 84) Erfurt, Thuringia, Germany
- Education: Philosophisch‑Theologisches Studium Erfurt
- Motto: Vestigia Christi sequi (“Follow the footsteps of Christ”)
- Coat of arms

Styles of Joachim Wanke
- Reference style: His Excellency; The Most Reverend
- Spoken style: Your Excellency
- Religious style: Bishop

Joachim Wanke (4 May 1941 – 12 March 2026) was a German Roman Catholic prelate, who served as the first bishop of the Diocese of Erfurt following its re-establishment after German reunification. He led the diocese from its formation in 1994 until his retirement in 2012. He was noted for his pastoral work in East Germany and his theological contributions within the German Bishops' Conference.

== Early life and education ==
Joachim Wanke was born on 4 May 1941 in Breslau, then in the Gau Lower Silesia (now Wrocław, Poland). His family was displaced to Ilmenau, Thuringia following World War II. He completed his secondary education before studying theology at the seminary in Erfurt.

== Priesthood and academic career ==
Wanke was ordained a priest on 26 June 1966. He initially served as a chaplain in Dingelstädt within the Eichsfeld region. In 1969, he returned to Erfurt for doctoral and habilitation studies in theology, eventually becoming a professor of New Testament exegesis at the Philosophisch‑Theologisches Studium in Erfurt.

== Episcopal ministry ==
In 1980, Pope John Paul II appointed Wanke as auxiliary bishop of the then Apostolic Administration of Erfurt-Meiningen with the right of succession. He was consecrated bishop on 26 November 1980 by Joachim Meisner. Upon the death of Hugo Aufderbeck in 1981, Wanke succeeded as Apostolic Administrator of the territory.

On 8 July 1994, when the Apostolic Administration of Erfurt-Meiningen was elevated to the new Diocese of Erfurt, Wanke became its first diocesan bishop. He served in this office for 18 years, guiding the diocese through the post-reunification era and advocating pastoral responses to religious life in a largely secular region.

During his tenure, he also chaired the Pastoral Commission of the German Bishops' Conference (1998–2010) and led the governing body responsible for the revision of the Einheitsübersetzung from 2008 until 2016.

Wanke was also mentioned in the context of Pope Benedict XVI's 2011 visit to Germany, during which authorities banned protests against the pope, highlighting Wanke's role as a leading figure in the diocese.

== Retirement and death ==
Wanke submitted his resignation for health reasons, which was accepted by Pope Benedict XVI on 1 October 2012. He died in Erfurt on 12 March 2026, at the age of 84, after a period of serious illness.

== Legacy ==
Wanke's episcopacy was marked by efforts to articulate and share the Christian message in a socio-cultural context shaped by long secularization. He was regarded as a thoughtful theologian and pastor within the Church in Germany.

Catholic Church titles
Preceded by Hugo Aufderbeck	Bishop of Erfurt; 1994–2012	Succeeded by Ulrich Neymeyr
Preceded by Pedro Reginaldo Lira	Titular Bishop of Castellum in Mauretania; 1980–1994	Succeeded by Teofil Wilski
