= Joseph Höffner =

German Roman Catholic cardinal

His Eminence Joseph Höffner
- Cardinal, Archbishop of Cologne
- Church: Roman Catholic Church
- Archdiocese: Cologne
- Metropolis: Cologne
- See: Cologne
- Appointed: 6 January 1969
- Installed: 24 February 1969
- Term ended: 14 September 1987
- Predecessor: Josef Frings
- Successor: Joachim Meisner
- Other posts: Cardinal-Priest of Sant’Andrea della Valle (1969-1987); President of the German Episcopal Conference (1976-1987)
- Previous posts: Bishop of Münster (1962–1969); Titular Archbishop of Aquileia (1969); Coadjutor Archbishop of Cologne (1969)

Orders
- Ordination: 30 October 1932 by Francesco Marchetti-Selvaggiani
- Consecration: 14 September 1962 by Matthias Wehr
- Created cardinal: 28 April 1969 by Pope Paul VI
- Rank: Cardinal-Priest

Personal details
- Born: Joseph Höffner; 24 December 1906 Horhausen, Kingdom of Prussia, German Empire
- Died: 16 October 1987 (aged 80) Cologne, West Germany
- Buried: Cologne Cathedral
- Motto: Justitia et Caritas ("Justice and Charity")
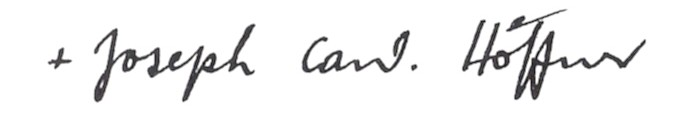
- Signature

- Coat of arms

Styles of Joseph Höffner
- Reference style: His Eminence
- Spoken style: Your Eminence
- Informal style: Cardinal
- See: Cologne (emeritus)

Joseph Höffner (24 December 1906 – 16 October 1987) was a German cardinal of the Roman Catholic Church. He served as the Archbishop of Cologne from 1969 to 1987 and was elevated to the cardinalate in 1969.

== Biography ==
Born in Horhausen, Höffner attended the seminary in Freiburg im Breisgau and the Pontifical Gregorian University in Rome before being ordained to the priesthood by Cardinal Francesco Marchetti-Selvaggiani on 30 October 1932. Having already earned a doctorate of philosophy in 1929, Höffner earned a doctorate of theology in Rome in 1934, another doctorate of theology in Freiburg im Breisgau in 1938, a degree in economics in 1939 and a doctorate in political science in 1940. After 1934, he also did pastoral work in Trier until 1945. After teaching at the Trier seminary for six years, Höffner was named to the University of Münster in 1951. He was the founder, director, and a professor of the Institute of Christian Social Sciences in Munich from 1951 to 1961, and was also a scientific advisor to three ministries of the Federal Republic.

On 9 July 1962, Höffner was appointed Bishop of Münster. He received his episcopal consecration on the following 14 September from Bishop Matthias Wehr, with Bishops Heinrich Baaken and Heinrich Tenhumberg serving as co-consecrators. Höffner attended the Second Vatican Council from 1962 to 1965, and was promoted to Coadjutor Archbishop of Cologne and Titular Archbishop of Aquileia on 6 January 1969. He succeeded Josef Frings as Archbishop of Cologne on 24 February of that same year.

Höffner was created Cardinal-Priest of Sant'Andrea della Valle by Pope Paul VI in the consistory of 28 April 1969. From 1976 to 1987, he was Chairman of the Conference of the German Bishops and thus the highest representative of the Catholic Church in Germany. The German prelate was one of the cardinal electors who participated in the conclaves of August and October 1978, which selected Pope John Paul I and Pope John Paul II respectively. Höffner resigned as Cologne's archbishop on 14 September 1987, after a period of seventeen years.

Höffner died the next month in Cologne at age 80, and is buried in the Cologne Cathedral. An expert in Catholic social doctrine, he was awarded the posthumous honor of "Righteous Among the Nations" in 2003 by the State of Israel, for having saved Jewish lives during World War II. The Deutsche Post honored him in 2006, on the occasion of his 100th birthday, with a stamp, which included his photo and episcopal motto "Justitia et Caritas".

In a 2007, the Archdiocese of Cologne indicated their intention to open the cause of beatification for Höffner.

Catholic Church titles
Preceded by Michael Keller	Bishop of Münster; 1962-1969	Succeeded by Heinrich Tenhumberg
Preceded by None	Titular Archbishop of Aquileia; 1969	Succeeded by Michele Cecchini
Preceded by Josef Frings	Archbishop of Cologne; 1969–1987	Succeeded by Joachim Meisner
Preceded by Luigi Traglia	Cardinal-Priest of Sant'Andrea della Valle; 1969-1987	Succeeded by Giovanni Canestri
Preceded by Julius Döpfner	President of the German Episcopal Conference; 1976–1987	Succeeded by Karl Lehmann
