= Hugo Aufderbeck =

- Born: 23 March 1909; Hellefeld (Sauerland), Westphalia, Germany
- Died: 17 January 1981; Erfurt, Thuringia, East Germany
- Occupations: Theologian and priest Auxiliary bishop

Coat of arms

Hugo Aufderbeck (23 March 1909 – 17 January 1981) was a Roman Catholic theologian. He served as Bishop and Apostolic Administrator in the Episcopal Office of Erfurt-Meiningen.

== Early years ==
Aufderbeck was born in Hellefeld, a small village in the heart of the Sauerland countryside, and located some 70 km (45 miles) to the southeast of Dortmund. He attended the local school and then studied Latin for a year with his vicar, Dr. Josef Brill. His early years were spent in a Roman Catholic environment, but he then switched to secondary school, the humanist "Laurentian Gymnasium" in nearby Arnsberg. He concluded his secondary schooling in Paderborn, where he was able to board at the archbishop's boys' seminary ("Seminarium Liborianum"). It was in Paderborn, as a pupil at the city's "Gymnasium Theodorianum" Cathedral School, that on 8 March 1930 he successfully passed his school final exams.

Remaining in Paderborn he now entered the episcopate's Pope Leo Episcopal Academy and studied Theology. This period also included two sabbatical semesters, in 1932/33, in Vienna and Munich. Then, from 1934 till 1936, he attended the Paderborn Catholic Priest Seminary. On 28 March 1936, in the Cathedral, Archbishop Caspar Klein ordained Hugo Aufderbeck into the priesthood.

Following his ordination Aufderbeck became a religious teacher in Gelsenkirchen at the Franciscan Sisters' Lyceum. In 1937 he began to study at the University of Münster for a higher level teaching qualification. This was cut short in 1938 when the course was closed under pressure from the government. Aufderbeck now relocated to the eastern part of the large Roman Catholic Archdiocese of Paderborn: he became vicar of the provost's parish of Saints Francis and Elizabeth in Halle, also becoming a student chaplain for the city.

== Wartime ==
In 1940 he took on pastoral responsibilities for soldiers in the Halle region, having already since September 1939 been creating a "Soldiers' Circle", in which regular soldiers, regardless of rank, met together. Using the military mail service he had built up and sustained a massive correspondence, which by Easter 1945 and the end of the war had involved several thousand soldiers. Mistrusted by the Gestapo, he was subject to house-searches and interrogation sessions, and by the end of the war at constant risk of arrest and punishment.

During the war Aufderbeck was in contact with the resistance group around Prof. Theodor Lieser. As the end approached Halle was occupied by US troops on 17 April 1945, and Theodor Lieser was installed by them as the city's Lord Mayor. Although Halle was liberated by Americans, by the time war ended zones of occupation had been agreed which placed Halle in the Soviet occupation zone in what remained of Germany, and in July 1945 the Americans withdrew and were replaced by the Red army. Both under US occupation and under the longer period of Soviet administration which followed, Aufderbeck focused on youth work. He was a member of the "Archbishop's Council for Imperiled Youth" ("Erziehungsbeirats für gefährdete Jugendliche") and of the "Advisory Council for Public Youth Support". He was the Roman Catholic representative in liaison with the newly formed Free German Youth (FDJ / Freie Deutsche Jugend). The FDJ was the youth wing of the recently renamed and reconstituted ruling party in this part of Germany, which by the later 1940s was in the process of reverting to one-party dictatorship. In 1947 Aufderbeck was appointed by Wilhelm Weskamm, the episcopal commissioner (who later became the Bishop of Berlin) as the permanent representative of the Archbishop's Commission for Youth Work in the Province of Saxony. The context for these developments, and for much of Aufdebeck's subsequent career, was the political frontier which since 1945 had divided the eastern half of the Paderborn archdiocese from Paderborn itself. Although this secular border was initially thoroughly porous, it would become progressively less so after the reinvention, formally in October 1949, of the Soviet occupation zone as the new Soviet sponsored German Democratic Republic. Because of the way in which FDJ activity was ever more overtly blended into the increasingly ubiquitous political activity of the ruling SED (party), Aufderbeck's contacts with the FDJ were fairly soon abandoned.

== Soviet occupation zone and German Democratic Republic ==
In 1948 Weskamm made Aufderbeck responsible for building up and directing spiritual support on behalf of the Archdiocesan Commission. The political division of Germany was becoming accepted as a permanent aspect of the post-war legacy. Within this political reality Aufderbeck and Weskamm, and then Weskamm's successor Friedrich Maria Rintelen created an increasingly separate structure for the eastern part of the Paderborn archdiocese, and in the process constructed an important spiritual and administrative focus for the Roman Catholic church in the German Democratic Republic. Of particular importance are Aufderbeck's efforts regarding liturgical renewal, the "priestless" offices in remoter areas, with Communion celebrated by members of the laity, and his work at preparing priests and believers for ideological confrontation with communism.

In 1955 he became a member of the Liturgical Commission of the Fulda Bishops' Conference of Pastoral Theologians in the German speaking lands. In 1956, at the invitation of the Trier based German Liturgical Institute, he took part in the first international Pastoral Liturgical Congress, held at Assisi. In 1958 he was appointed a Papal chamberlain and in 1959 a Papal Honorary Prelate. On 19 June 1962 The Pope appointed Aufderbeck Titular bishop of Arca in Phoenicia and an Auxiliary bishop with his base in Erfurt. The sudden erection in August 1961 of the Berlin Wall had made it clearer than ever that the eastern part of the Paderborn archdiocese could no longer be administered from Paderborn. Aufderbeck received his episcopal ordination on 5 September 1962 from Archbishop of Berlin (later Cardinal) Alfred Bengsch.

== Death ==
Aufderbeck became aware of his incurable cancer in 1977. He signed his last will on 15 December 1980. He died on 17 January 1981 in the Erfurt Catholic Hospital.

== See also ==
- Catholic Church in Germany
