= German Bishops' Conference =

Assembly of Catholic bishops in Germany

The German Bishops' Conference (German: Deutsche Bischofskonferenz) is the episcopal conference of the bishops of the Catholic dioceses in Germany. Members include diocesan bishops, coadjutors, auxiliary bishops, and diocesan administrators.

== History ==
The first meeting of the German bishops took place in Würzburg in 1848, and in 1867 the Fulda Conference of Bishops ("next to the grave of St. Boniface") was established, which reorganized as German Bishops' Conference in 1966. The annual autumn conference of the German bishops still takes place in Fulda, while the meeting in spring is held at alternating places.

After the construction of the Berlin Wall the ordinaries in the East German Democratic Republic (GDR) were unable to participate in the Fulda Conference of Bishops. In 1974 the GDR formally suggested talks with the Holy See. As one of the outcomes, the Berlin Conference of Bishops was established for the East German ordinaries on 26 July 1976. The Diocese of Berlin, also comprising West Berlin, was thereafter represented in the German Bishops' Conference and the Berlin Conference alike, in the former by its vicar general, in the latter by the bishop personally. The Catholic Church did not consider the Berlin Conference as a national Bishops' Conference, since the Holy See officially conceived the East German ordinaries as part of the German Bishops' Conference as papally confirmed by its statute on 26 September 1976. East Germany's diocesan structure was complicated. Since 1972 three sees had their seat in East Germany, the dioceses of Berlin and of Dresden-Meissen and the Apostolic Administration of Görlitz. The rest of East Germany belonged to dioceses seated in West Germany, which appointed commissaries for the East German parts of their dioceses. The Berlin Conference was disestablished in 1990.

On 25 September 2018, the national Episcopal Conference threw the presentation of a self-commissioned study from which resulted at least 3,700 cases of sexual abuse in Germany from 1946 to 2014. More than a half were child abuse cases.

In 2010, The New York Times published the allegations of sexual abuses committed by a priest of the Munich diocese in the 80s. It was preceded by the ones of Lawrence Murphy in Wisconsin, happened in a school for deaf children from 1950 to 1974.

The conference's maxim that, where other creatures are concerned, "we can speak of the priority of [their] being over [their] being useful" was commended by Pope Francis in his 2015 encyclical letter Laudato si'.

== Chairmen ==
=== Fulda Conference of Bishops (1848–1965) ===
- Johannes von Geissel, Cardinal, Archbishop of Cologne (1848)
- Paulus Melchers, Cardinal, Archbishop of Cologne (1867–1883)
- Philipp Krementz, Cardinal, Archbishop of Cologne (1884–1896)
- Georg von Kopp, Cardinal, Prince-Bishop of Breslau (1897–1913)
- Felix von Hartmann, Cardinal, Archbishop of Cologne (1914–1919)
- Adolf Bertram, Cardinal, Prince-Archbishop of Breslau (1920–1945)
- Josef Frings, Cardinal, Archbishop of Cologne (1945–1965)

=== German Bishops' Conference (since 1966) ===
- Julius Döpfner, Cardinal, Archbishop of Munich and Freising (1965–1976)
- Joseph Höffner, Cardinal, Archbishop of Cologne (1976–1987)
- Karl Lehmann, Cardinal, Bishop of Mainz (1987–2008)
- Robert Zollitsch, Archbishop of Freiburg (18 February 2008 – 12 March 2014)
- Reinhard Marx, Cardinal, Archbishop of Munich and Freising (12 March 2014 – 3 March 2020)
- Georg Bätzing, Bishop of Limburg (3 March 2020 – 24 February 2026)
- Heiner Wilmer, Bishop of Hildesheim (24 February 2026)

=== Chairmen of the Berlin Conference of Bishops (1976–1990) ===
- Alfred Bengsch, Cardinal, Archbishop (personal title) of Berlin (1976–1979)
- Gerhard Schaffran, Bishop of Dresden-Meissen (1980–1982)
- Joachim Meisner, Cardinal (in 1983), Bishop of Berlin and then Archbishop of Cologne (1982–1989)
- Joachim Wanke, Administrator Apostolic of the Episcopal Office in Erfurt-Meiningen (1989, per pro)
- Georg Sterzinsky, Cardinal, Bishop of Berlin (1989–1990)

== See also ==
- Catholic Church in Germany
- Synodal Way
