= Milunović =

Milunović (Serbian Cyrillic: Милуновић, pronounced [mǐlunoʋitɕ, milǔː-]) is a Serbian surname derived from a masculine given name Milun. It may refer to:

- Luka Milunović (born 1992), footballer
- Nemanja Milunović (born 1989), football defender
- Mihael Milunović (born 1967), artist
- Milo Milunović (1897–1967), painter
