= Ernst Hilger =

Austrian gallery owner (1950–2025)

Ernst Hilger (28 February 1950 – 26 May 2025) was an Austrian curator as well as the owner and founder of Hilger modern/contemporary and Hilger BrotKunsthalle.

A gallery owner and a philanthropist mediator, Hilger travelled the world in search of new art while also providing a platform for established artists. He championed the less well-known contemporary art of countries like Iran and places such as Latin America and Africa. Hilger made decisions on exhibiting based on his extensive knowledge of the international art market and also his on-site research in the art hotspots in the cities he visited.

== Biography ==
Ernst Hilger was born in Vienna on 28 February 1950, and died on 26 May 2025, at the age of 75.

- Elementary school, secondary school (at Theresianum, Rainergasse, Vienna)
- Graduated high-school in 1968
- Studied business administration (Vienna University of Economics and Business)
- Began working as official for cultural and other events
- Founded and managed Atlantis Folklokal, parallel to his university studies
- Drew up program for the Zentralsparkasse's Youth Club
- Founded the students' edition "édition étudiante"
- 1971: Founding shareholder of Galerie Academia/Salzburg
- 1972: Founding shareholder of Galerie Spectrum
- 1974: Co-publisher of GALERIENSPIEGEL, the first Austrian art magazine, together with Paul Kruntorad; important art critics, such as Liesbeth Wächter-Böhm, for example, had their first opportunity here to publish their comprehensive art reviews;
- 1976: Started his own art gallery at Dorotheergasse
- 1977: Began to publish
- Since 1996 increased promotional activities for young artists
- together with Siemens Austria Founded artLab
- 1997: Expanded the program to Central Europe, with artists such as Mihael Milunovic, Maja Vukoje, Renata Poljak, etc.
- 1997: founding the internet-magazine for art www.artmagazine.cc
- 2003: opening des hilger contemporary, platform for international contemporary art
- Kuratorische Leitung des Projekts Austrian Art Lounge der Austrian Airlines
- Präsident der FEAGA (Europ. Galerieverband) bis 1997
- 2009 opening of HilgerBROTKunsthalle

== Publications of Verlag Galerie Ernst Hilger about and together with ==
In 1976, first publication together with Manfred Chobot, and with illustrations by Alfred Hrdlicka. Next, H. C. Artmann and Uwe Bremer: "die Heimholung des Hammers" (Bringing the hammer back home) Alfred Hrdlicka – Register of art works from prints and graphics to sculpture and writings, more exhibition catalogues and catalogues on various topics: Museum Moderner Kunst Passau, Frankfurter Kunstverein, Vienna Künstlerhaus. Karl Korab – Register of graphic works, together with Dr. Walter Koschatzky (1982) and monography with Dr. Assmann and Prof. Dr. Ronte (1999). Gunter Damisch (Museum catalogue for the Museum Folkwang, Essen). Franz Ringel, commissioned by the Museum of Art History/Palais Harrach; Hans Staudacher (for the Museum of Art History/Palais Harrach); Georg Eisler (3 catalogues and the big monography for Österreichische Galerie Oberes Belevedere, catalogue and book for Albertina and Museum of Art History/Palais Harrach); Karl Korab (for the Museum of Art History/Palais Harrach); Christian Attersee (for the Museum of Art History/Palais Harrach); Alfred Hrdlicka (for the Museum of Art History/Palais Harrach) 1998, 2002. Amor Roma, commissioned by the Museum for Modern Art, together Lorand Hegyi as author. Contemporary Art from Rome, Leo Zogmayer, Nikolaus Moser (exhibition catalogue for Folkwang Museum Essen) Sebastian Weissenbacher, Hans Fronius, Adolf Frohner – among other things: Albertina catalogue. Christian Ludwig Attersee, Oscar Bottolo (register of works) The Art of Bronze Casting – The Zöttl Studio. Etchings – The Kurt Zein Studio. Central – New Art from Central Europe, (5) Register of works by Mel Ramos.

Numerous publications for artLab – An initiative by Siemens Austria and Galerie Ernst Hilger.

Publications on contemporary artists (France and Italy): Sandro Chia, Bruno Ceccobelli, Tirelli, Pizzi Canella and artists of Figuration Narrative – Erró, Gérard Fromanger, Peter Klasen, Jacques Monory, Bernard Rancillac.

== International Museums – Exhibitions and Exhibitions of Austrian Art with Publications ==
Surface Radical – Young Artists from Austria at Grand Palais, Paris, with Lorand Hegyi as curator, 1990. Master works of Albertina at Grand Palais – Special showing at SAGA Paris, 1989. 4x4 Generations of Austrian Art, Düsseldorf, 1990, together with Dr. Lorand Hegyi, Dr. Dieter Schrage, Prof. Peter Baum. SERVUS – 5 Artists from Austria, at Mannheimer Kunstverein, 1997. Infeld Collection 1 – 3; Portrait of a Collection, at Landesgalerie Eisenstadt. Art and Virtual Reality – The Collection of Bank Austria, Palais Harrach, 1998; Poliakoff from the Würth Collection, Künstlerhaus, Vienna, 1998. Moser, Wölzl, Zogmayer – Künstlerhaus, Vienna. Leo Zogmayer at the Museum of Modern Art/Liechtenstein, curator Lorand Hegyi, 1990. 7 exhibitions in the course of the Bank Austria/trend-profil series of exhibitions at the Museum of Art History/Palais Harrach, Österreichische Galerie Oberes Belvedere and Albertina at the Austrian National Library, 1997 to 2002 (Georg Eisler, Karl Korab, Franz Ringel, Christian Ludwig Attersee, Alfred Hrdlicka, Hans Staudacher). "Wagnis Wagner" (Venturing Wagner), together with Alfred Hrdilicka, Meiningen 2002. Central – New Art from Central Europe at Museumsquartier, curators Carl Aginer and Lorand Hegyi, 2001 Alfred Hrdilicak at the Museum of Art History/Palais Harrach, curator Peter Baum. Central Europe revisited I+II at Castle Esterházy/ Eisenstadt 2006/2007 tbc...

== Important positions ==
- Founding member of the Association of Austrian Galleries of Modern Art, together with Herbert Grass.
- 1987–1993: Member of the Artistic Advisory Council of Art Basel for Austria
- 1998/1999: Member of the Bank Austria Artistic Advisory Council
- Since 1996: Artistic Director and Curator of Siemens Austria Collection and Siemens Sponsoring Program for Young Art
- Since 1996: Member of the Artistic Advisory Council of Wiener Kunstmesse at the Museum for Applied Arts
- 1986–1998: Chairman of the Association of Austrian Galleries of Modern Art
- 1998: Curator of the Festival Exhibitions, Eisenstadt
- 1999: Member of the Artistic Advisory Council of the SCA Art Jury
- 2003: Chairman of the Association of European Galleries of Modern Art

== Galleries ==
- Since 1971 in Vienna
- 1987–1993: outlet in Frankfurt
- Since 1998: outlet in Paris to promote Austrian modern and young art
- Since 1998: artLab – An initiative by Siemens Austria and Galerie Ernst Hilger
- Since 2009: BROTKunsthalle

== Awards and honours ==
- 1996 – Award by the City of Vienna
- 2000 – Professor title in honor (by the cultural ministry of Austria)
- 2002 – Officier of the Ordre des Arts et des Lettres
- 2009 – Golden Grand-Award by the City of Vienna
