= St. Hedwig's Cathedral =

Roman Catholic cathedral in Berlin, Germany

Coordinates: 52°30′57″N 13°23′41″E

- St.-Hedwigs-Kathedrale
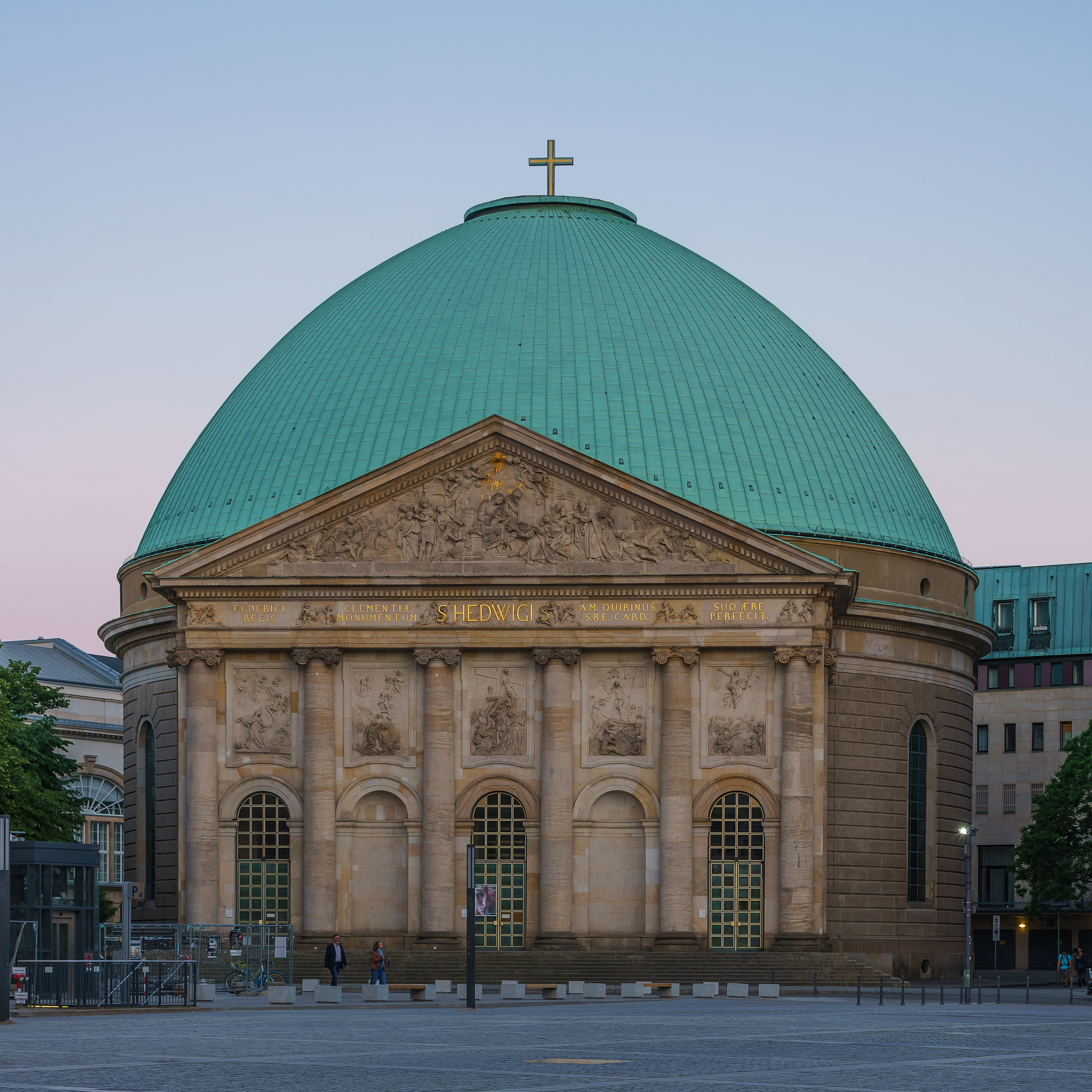
- St. Hedwig's Cathedral in 2018

Religion
- Affiliation: Roman Catholic
- Province: Archdiocese of Berlin
- Year consecrated: 1773

Location
- Location: Mitte, Berlin, Germany
- Interactive map of St. Hedwig's Cathedral

Architecture
- Architects: Georg Wenzeslaus von Knobelsdorff (original); Hans Schwippert (reconstruction)
- Style: Baroque (original) post-war modernism (reconstruction)
- Completed: 1887 (original); 1963 (reconstruction); 2024 (renovation)

Specifications
- Direction of façade: North-west
- Height (max): 77 m, 2 m high cross
- Dome: 2
- Dome height (outer): 71 m, roof
- Spire: 2
- Spire height: 75 m, middle cross
- Materials: Stones, Copper, Stucco

Website
- www.hedwigs-kathedrale.de

St. Hedwig's Cathedral (German: St.-Hedwigs-Kathedrale) is the Catholic cathedral of the Archdiocese of Berlin on Bebelplatz in the historic centre of Berlin. Dedicated in honor of Hedwig of Silesia, it was erected from 1747 to 1773 by order of Frederick the Great according to plans by Georg Wenzeslaus von Knobelsdorff in Baroque style. Damaged during the Allied bombing in World War II, the cathedral's interior was restored from 1952 to 1963 in post-war modernist style as part of the rebuilding of the Forum Fridericianum on Bebelplatz. The listed building was closed for renovation work from 2018 and reopened on November 24, 2024 with a modern interior design.

== History and architecture ==
St. Hedwig's Church was built in the 18th century following a request from local parishioners to King Frederick II. He donated the land on which the church was built. The church was dedicated to the patron of Silesia and Brandenburg, Saint Hedwig of Andechs. It was the first Catholic church built in Prussia after the Reformation. The building was designed by Georg Wenzeslaus von Knobelsdorff and modelled after the Pantheon in Rome.

Construction started in 1747, but was interrupted and delayed several times by economic problems. It was not opened until 1 November 1773, when the king's friend, Ignacy Krasicki, the Bishop of Warmia (later Archbishop of Gniezno), officiated at the cathedral's consecration.

After the Kristallnacht pogroms that took place on the night of 9–10 November 1938, Bernhard Lichtenberg, a canon of the cathedral chapter of St. Hedwig since 1931, prayed publicly for Jews at evening prayer. Lichtenberg was later jailed by the Nazis and died on the way to the concentration camp at Dachau. In 1965, Blessed Bernhard Lichtenberg's remains were transferred to the crypt at St. Hedwig's Cathedral.

The cathedral was severely damaged by Allied bombing in an air raid on 1 March 1943. Only the damaged shell of the building was left standing. Reconstruction started in 1952 and on 1 November 1963, All Saints' Day, the new high altar was consecrated by the Bishop of Berlin, Alfred Cardinal Bengsch.

Between 1949 and 1990, St. Hedwig's was in East Berlin, under the control of the East German government.

The cathedral closed for major renovations on 1 September 2018. The relics of Bl. Bernhard Lichtenberg have been transferred to the crypt of Maria Regina Martyrum during the cathedral's renovation. The church of St. Joseph in Wedding is the interim location for pontifical masses. A focal point of the renovations is a hemispherical altar composed of small stones from around the diocese collected by parishioners, based on an idea proposed by Austrian artist Leo Zogmayer. The two-story interior of 1963, with a wide gallery and an awkwardly narrow opening down to the chancel, was divided into two floors, with the new church interior on the upper level.

== Tapestries ==
Fitting to the character of the liturgical season, a huge tapestry is hanging behind the cathedra. The cathedral owns three of them; all three share the motif of the heavenly Jerusalem.

The tapestry of former Bauhaus student Margaretha Reichardt (Grete Reichardt) (1907–1984) of Erfurt was handwoven in 1963. It depicts a stylised city with the names of the apostles inscribed on foundation stones. God is represented by the Tree of Life and a lamb features as a symbol of Christ. Anton Wendling (1891–1965) made a colorful appliqué work. It is a geometric composition using themes from the Book of Revelation. The three-part woven carpet by Else Bechteler-Moses (born 1933) was made in cooperation with Nürnberger Gobelinmanufaktur GmbH, a tapestry weaving company, between 1979 and 1981. It also draws on themes from Revelation.

== Burials in the crypt ==
- Konrad von Preysing
- Alfred Bengsch
- Bernhard Lichtenberg
- Georg Sterzinsky

== Gallery ==
Historical images

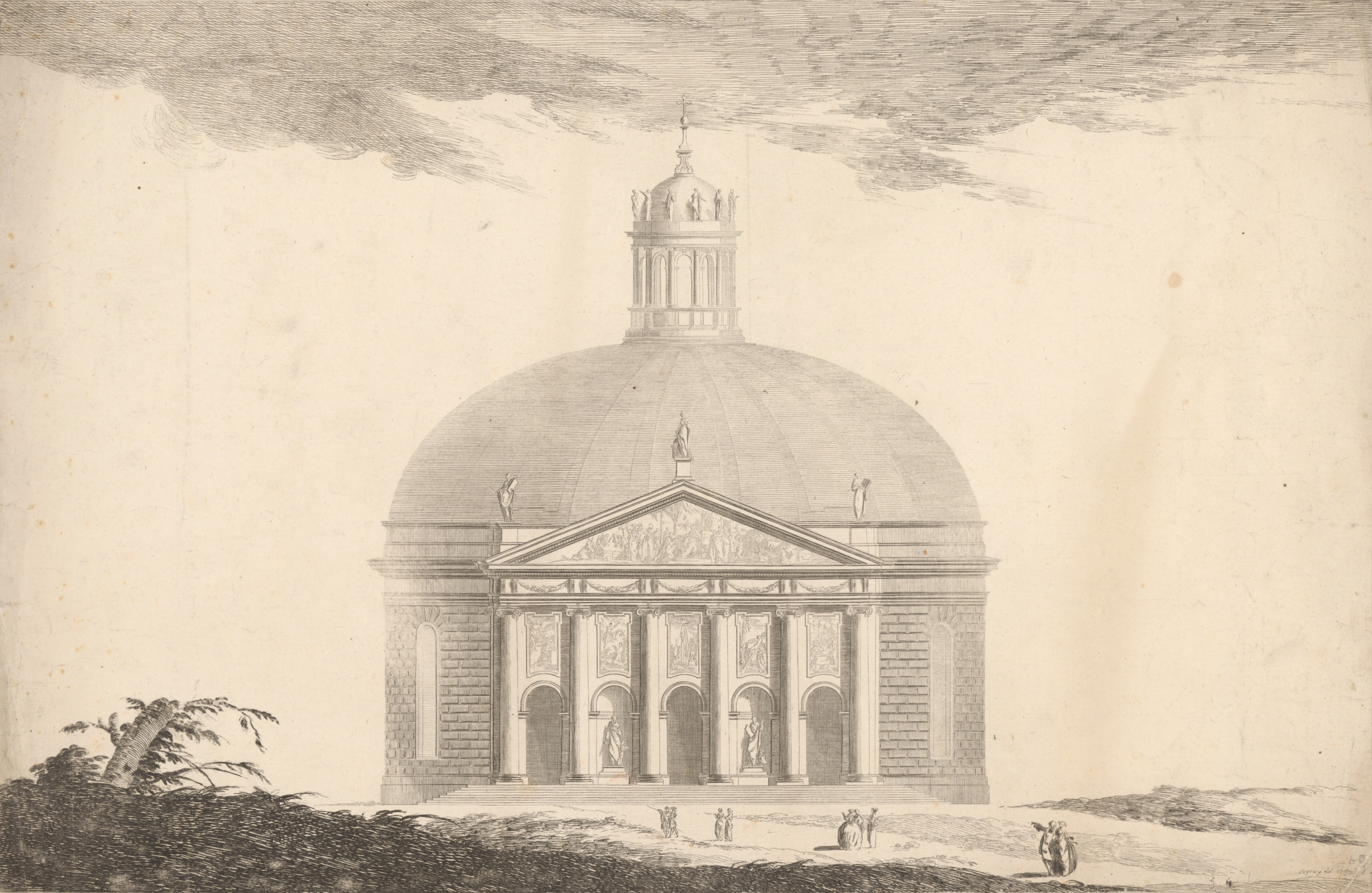
Plan of Jean Laurent Legeay with Drawing of Georg Wenzeslaus von Knobelsdorff in 1747, the top dome was never rebuilt

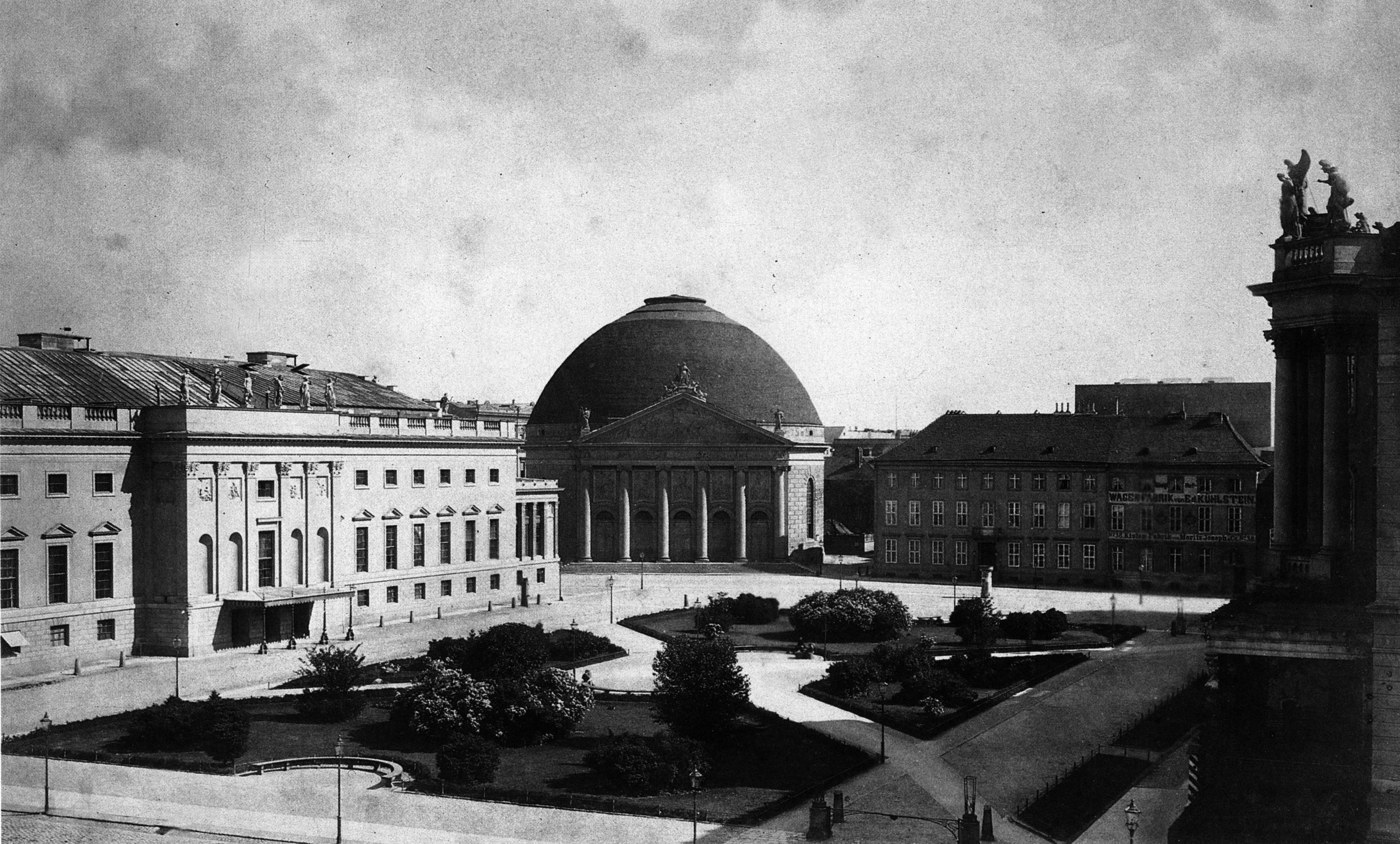
Opernplatz with undone church before 1886

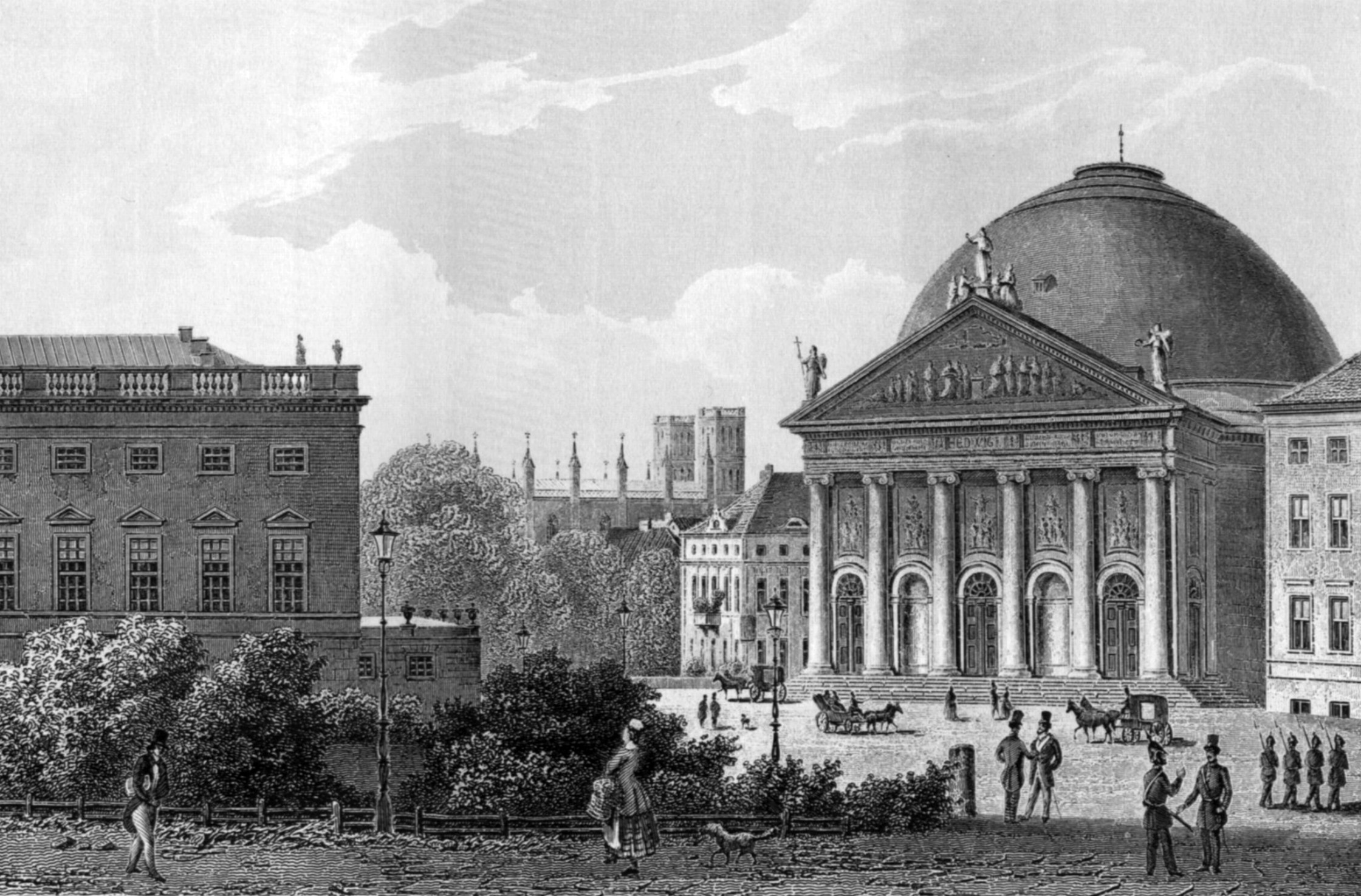
Drawing of the cathedral by Joseph Maximilian Kolb, 1850

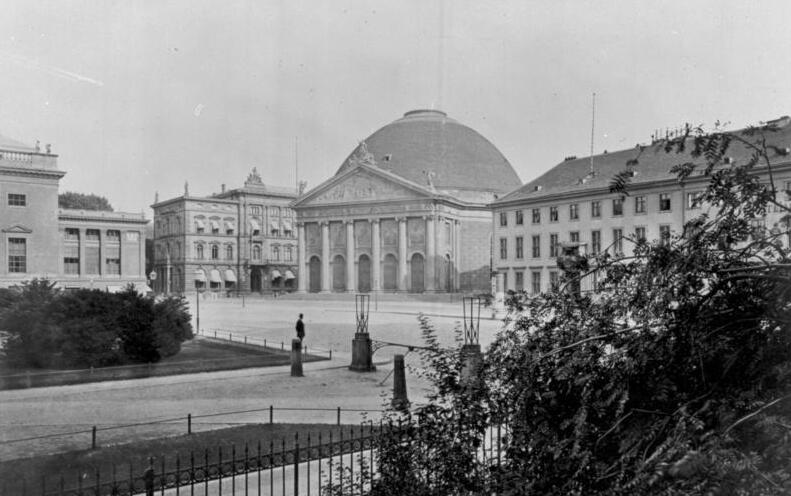
Cathedral in 1886

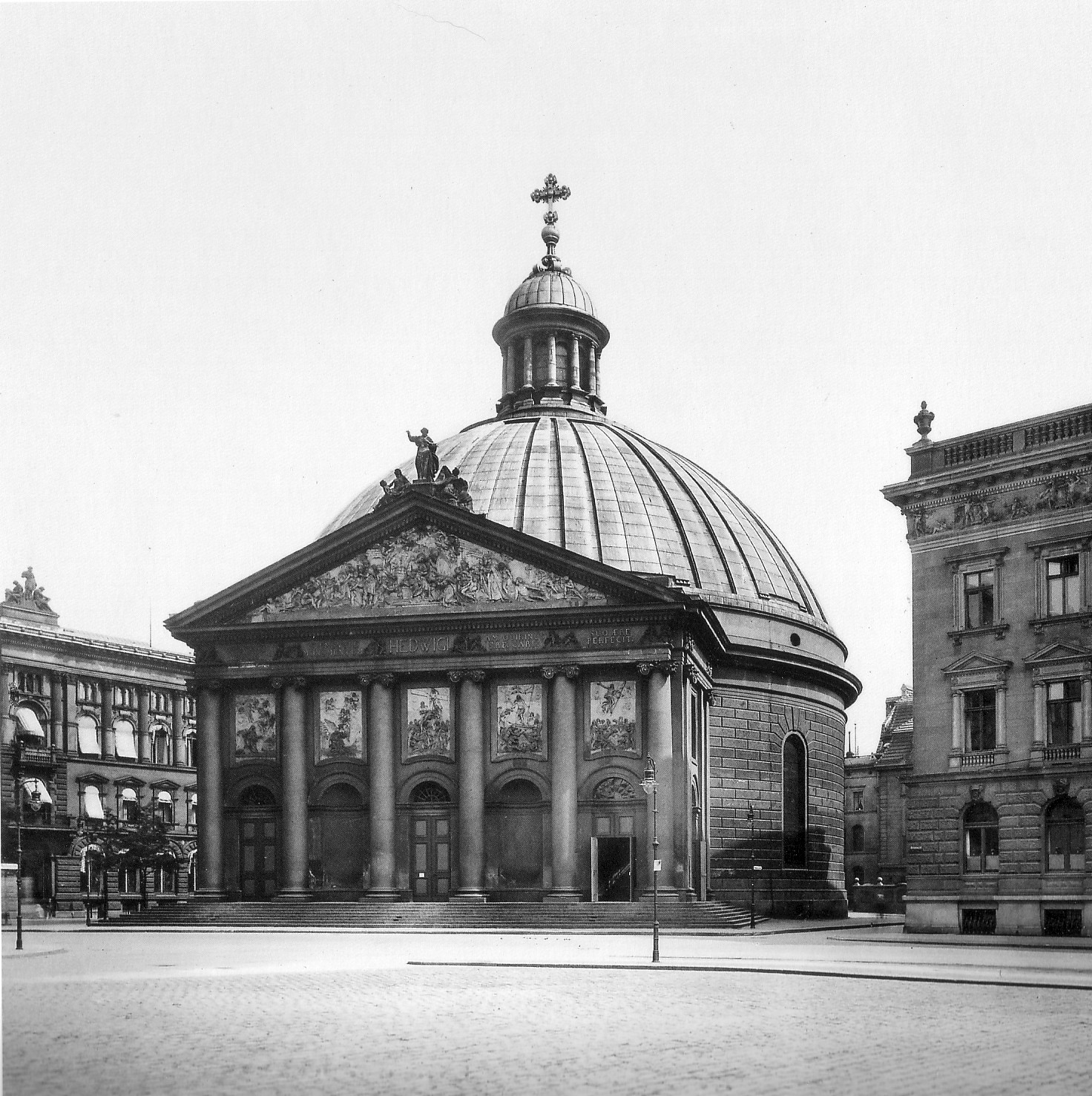
Cathedral after 1886

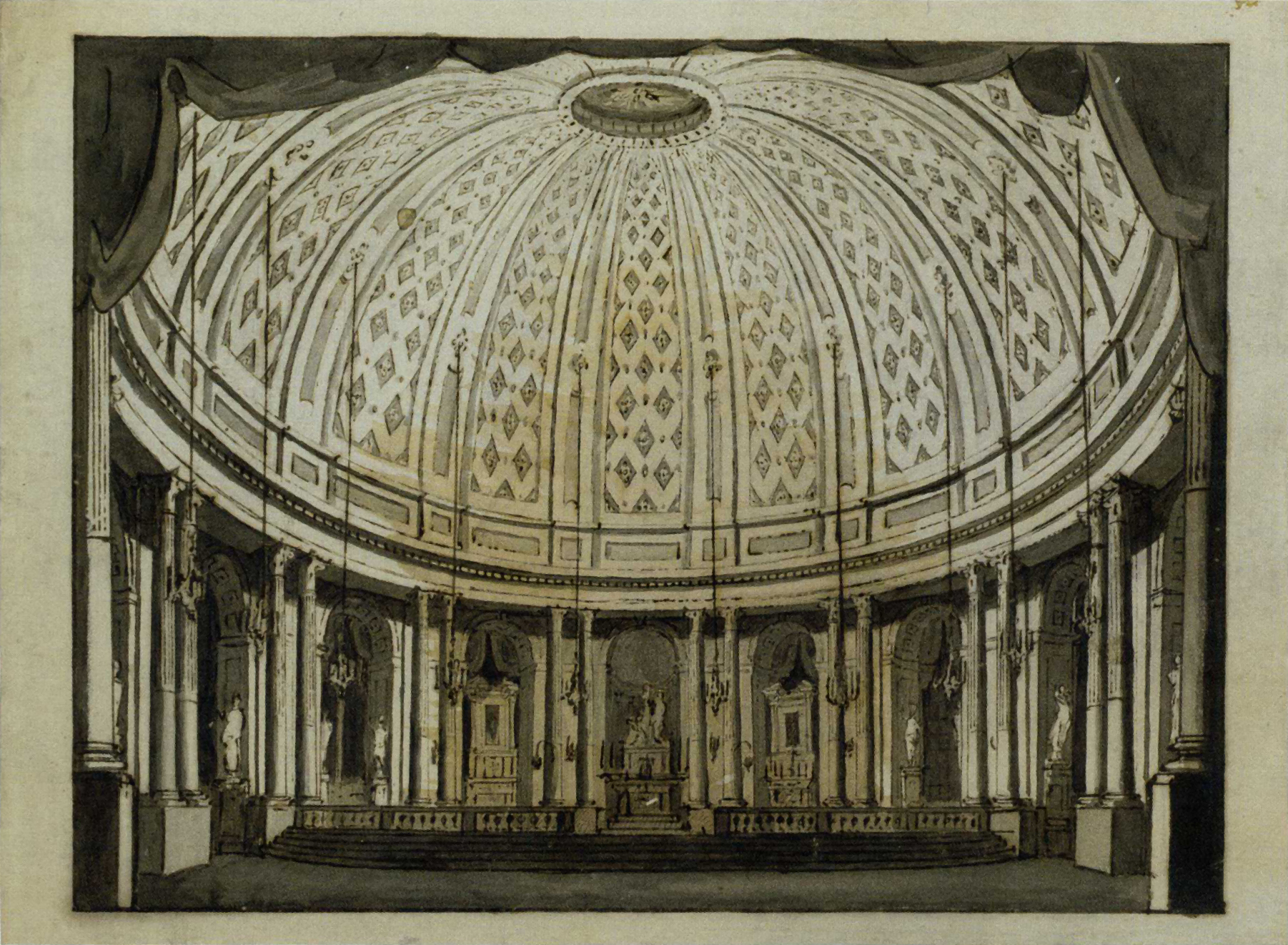
Interior by 1780

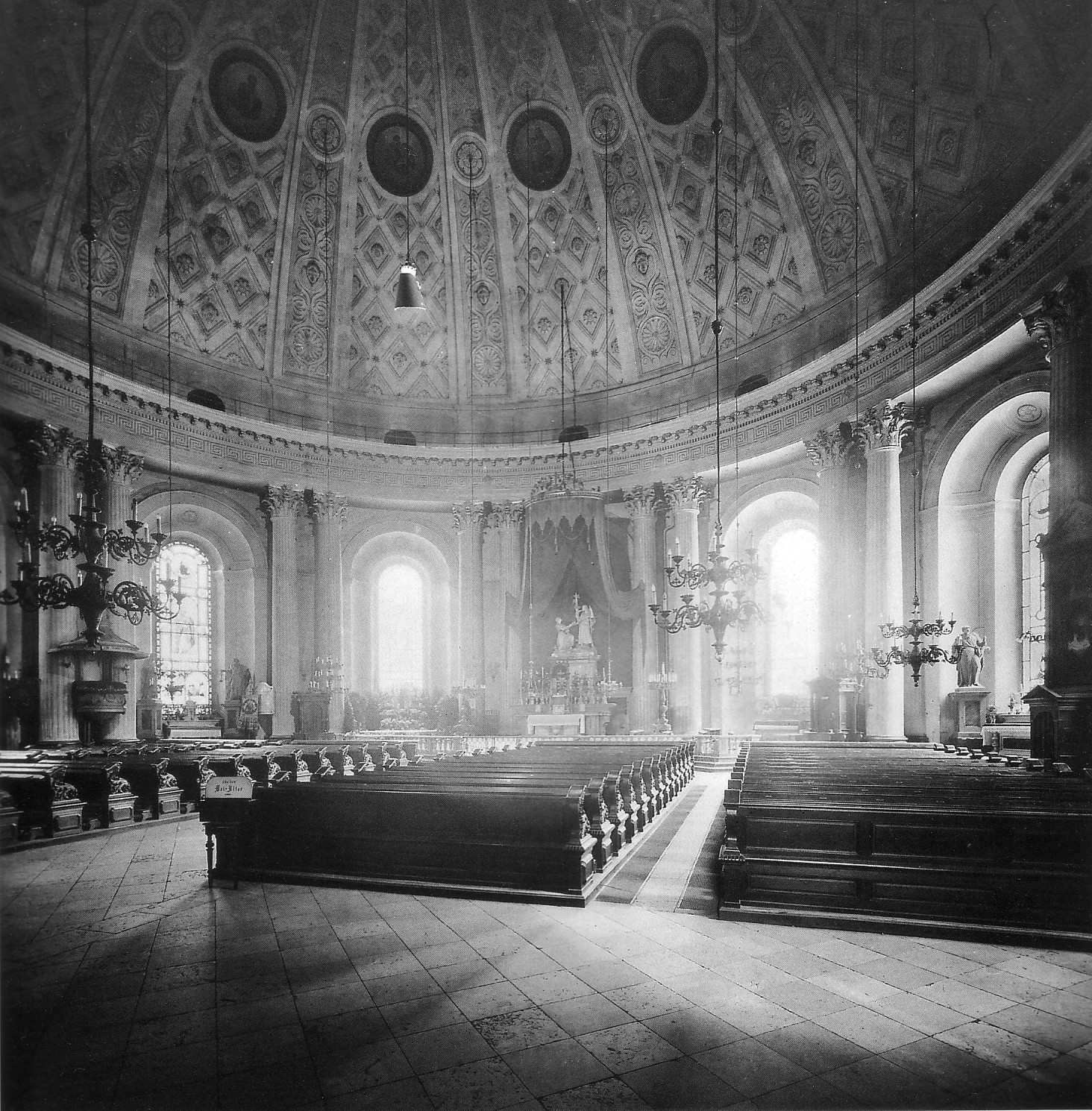
Interior before air raids of 1943

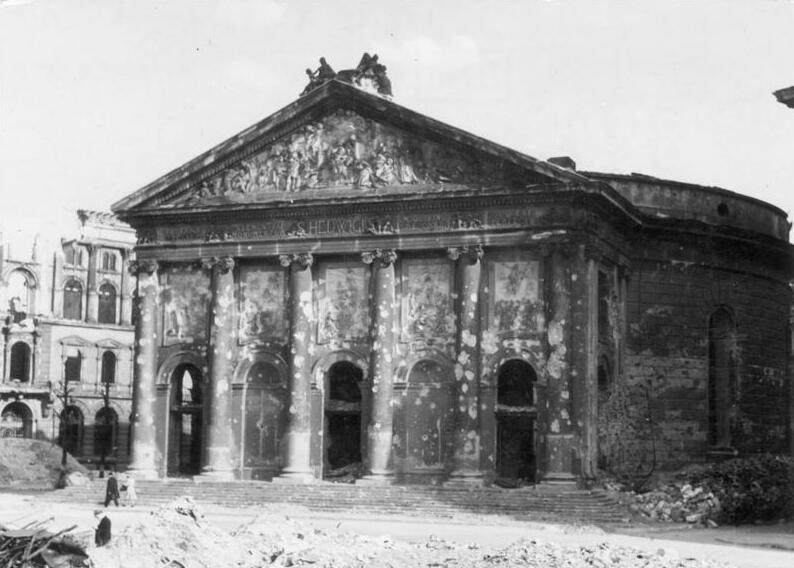
Ruins of the cathedral after WWII in 1946
Interior of 1963

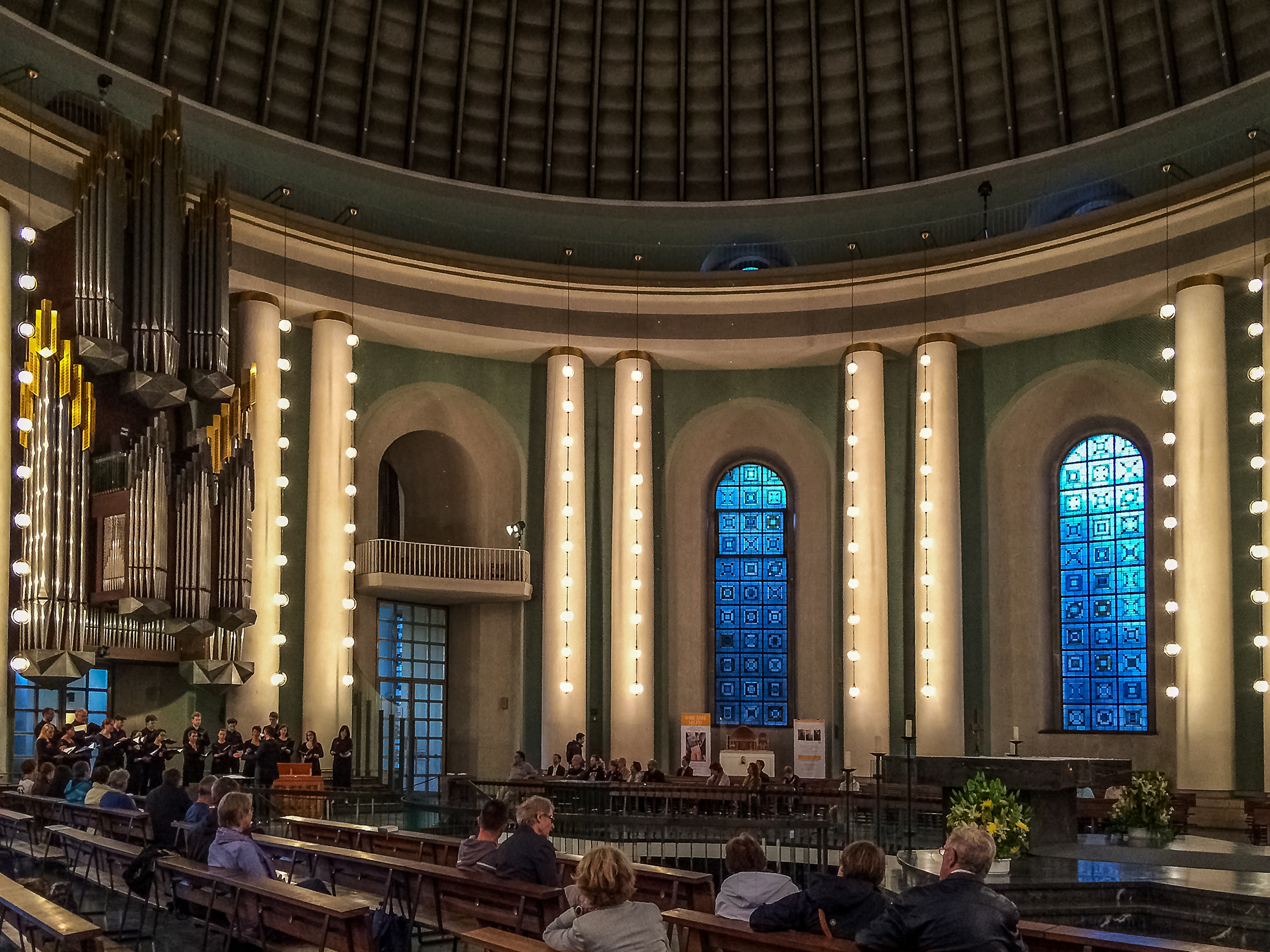
Interior with organ in June 2014

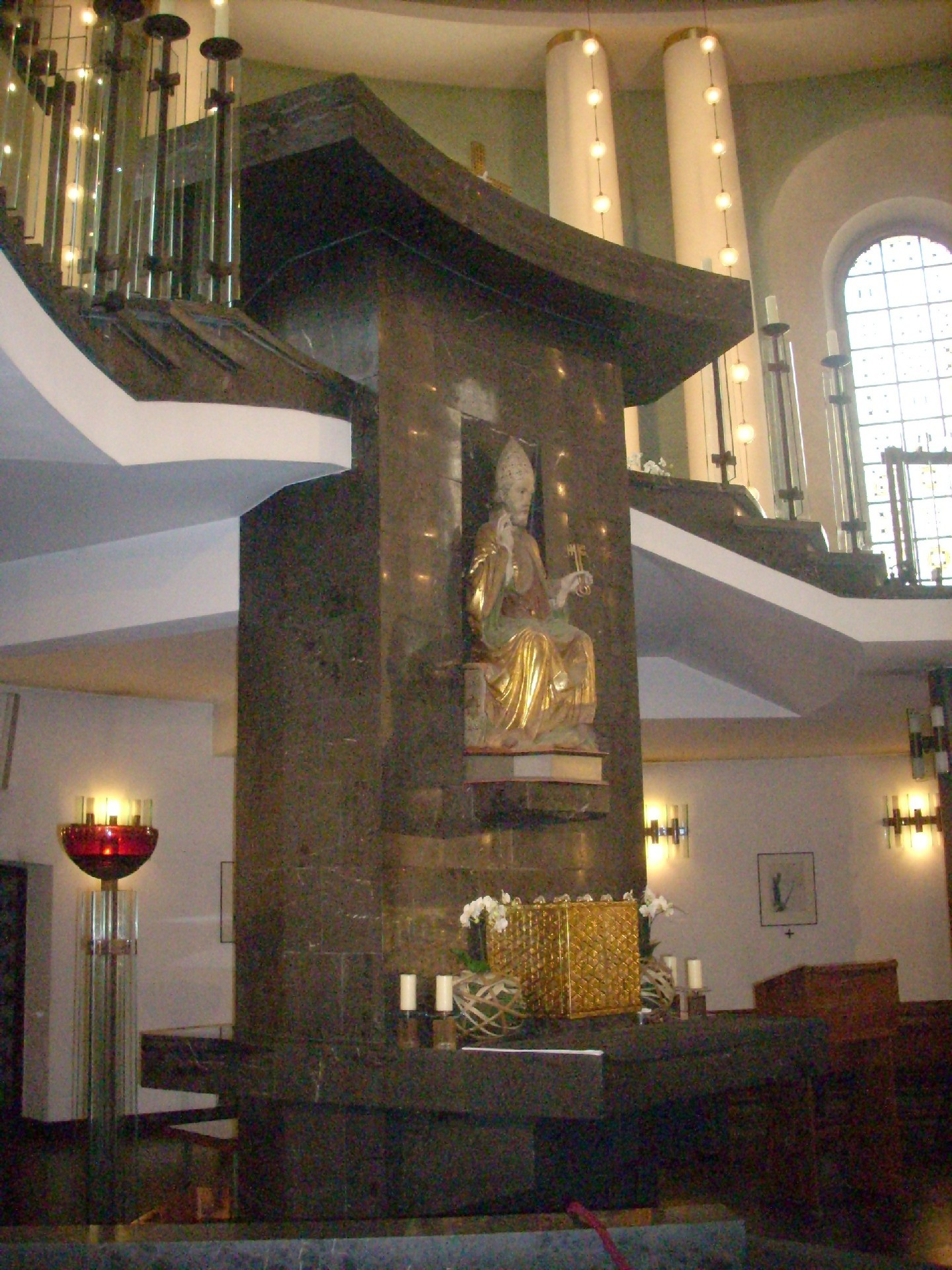
Altar Column

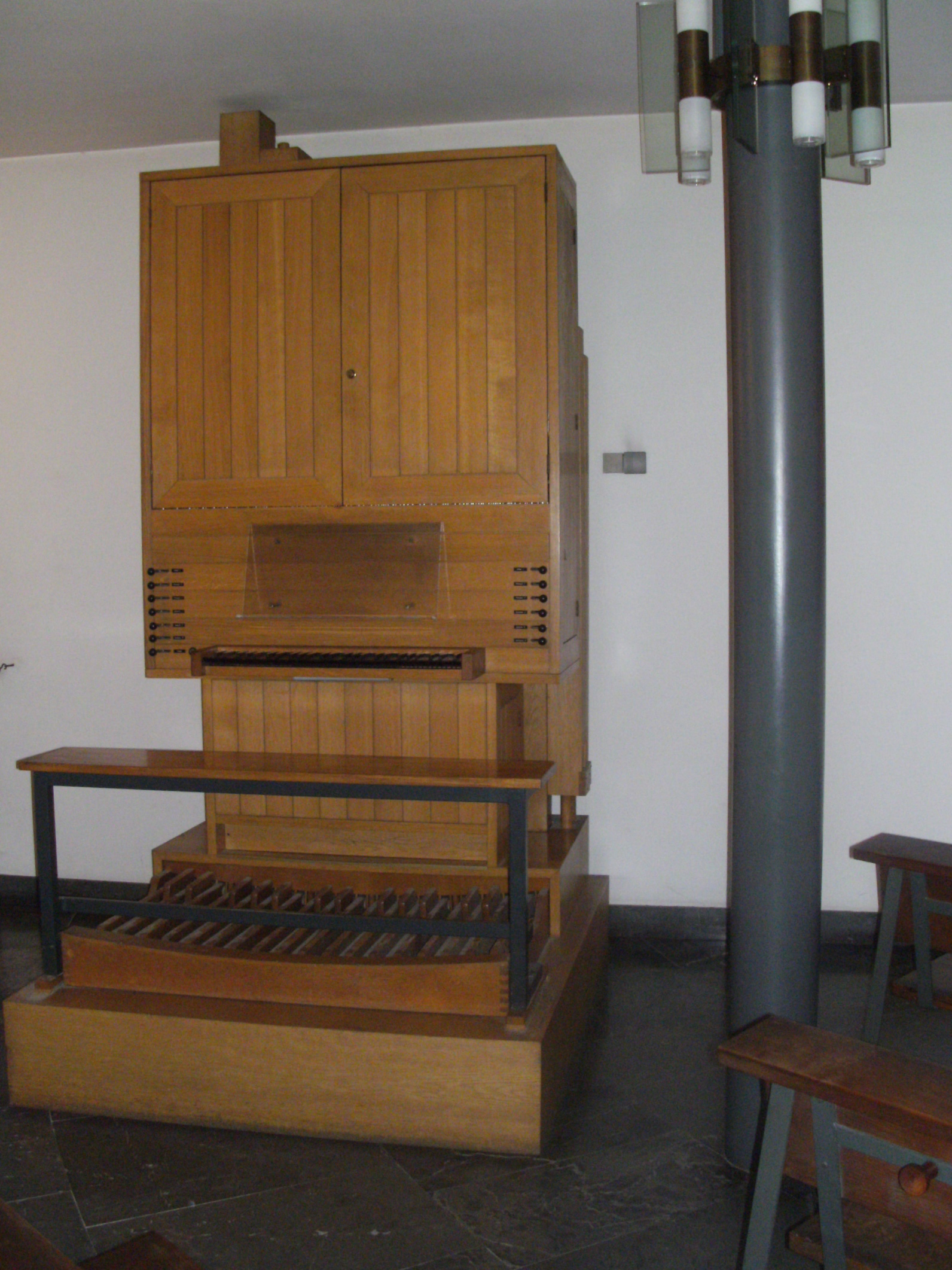
Organ in the lower church

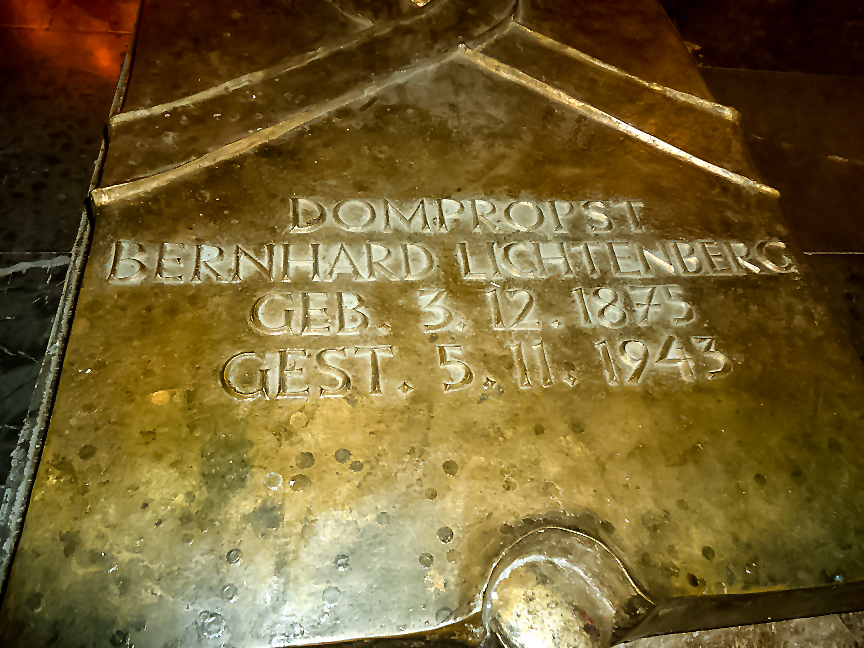
Tomb of Bernhard Lichtenberg in crypt
Redesigned interior of 2024

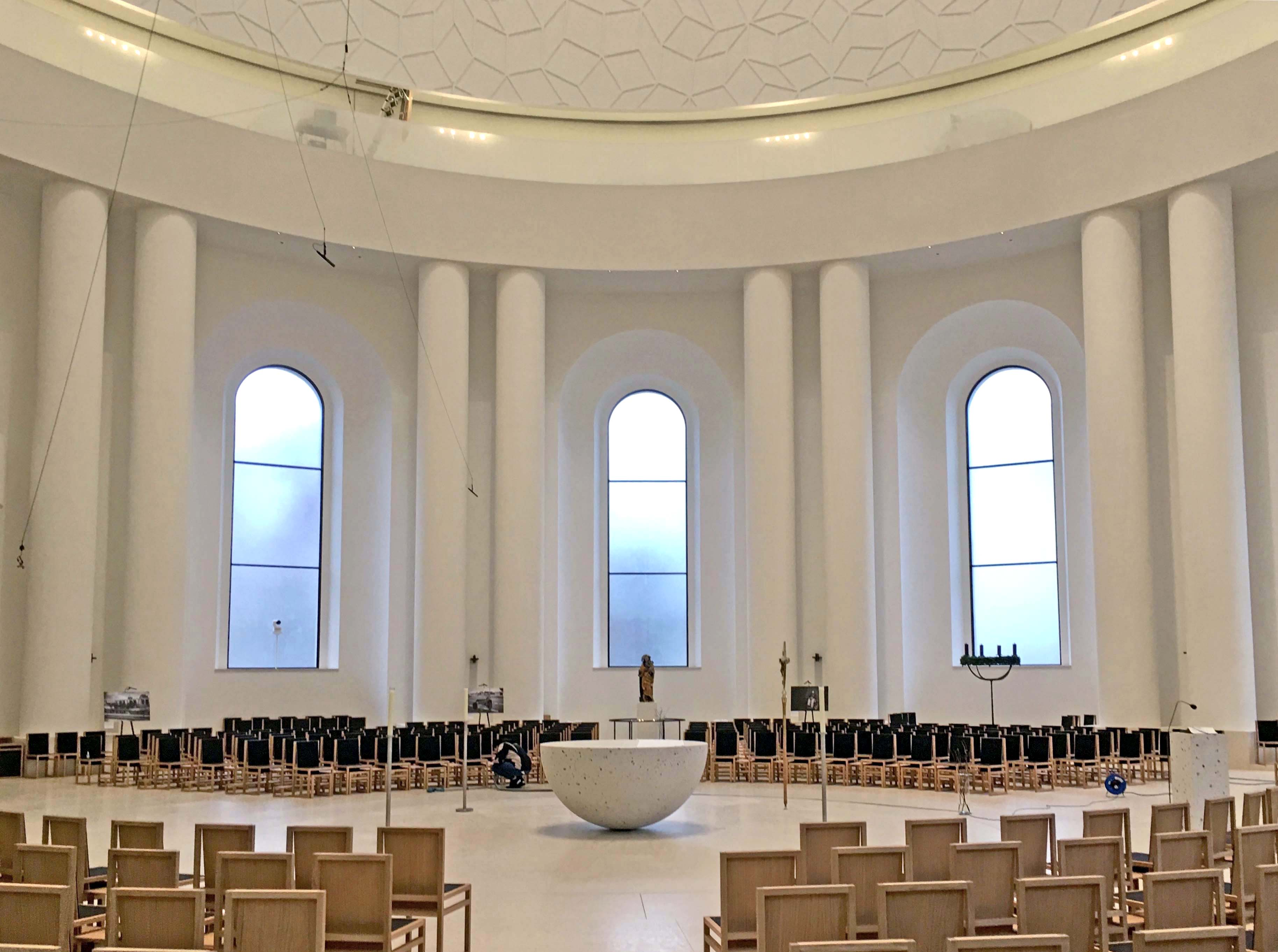
Interior in December 2024

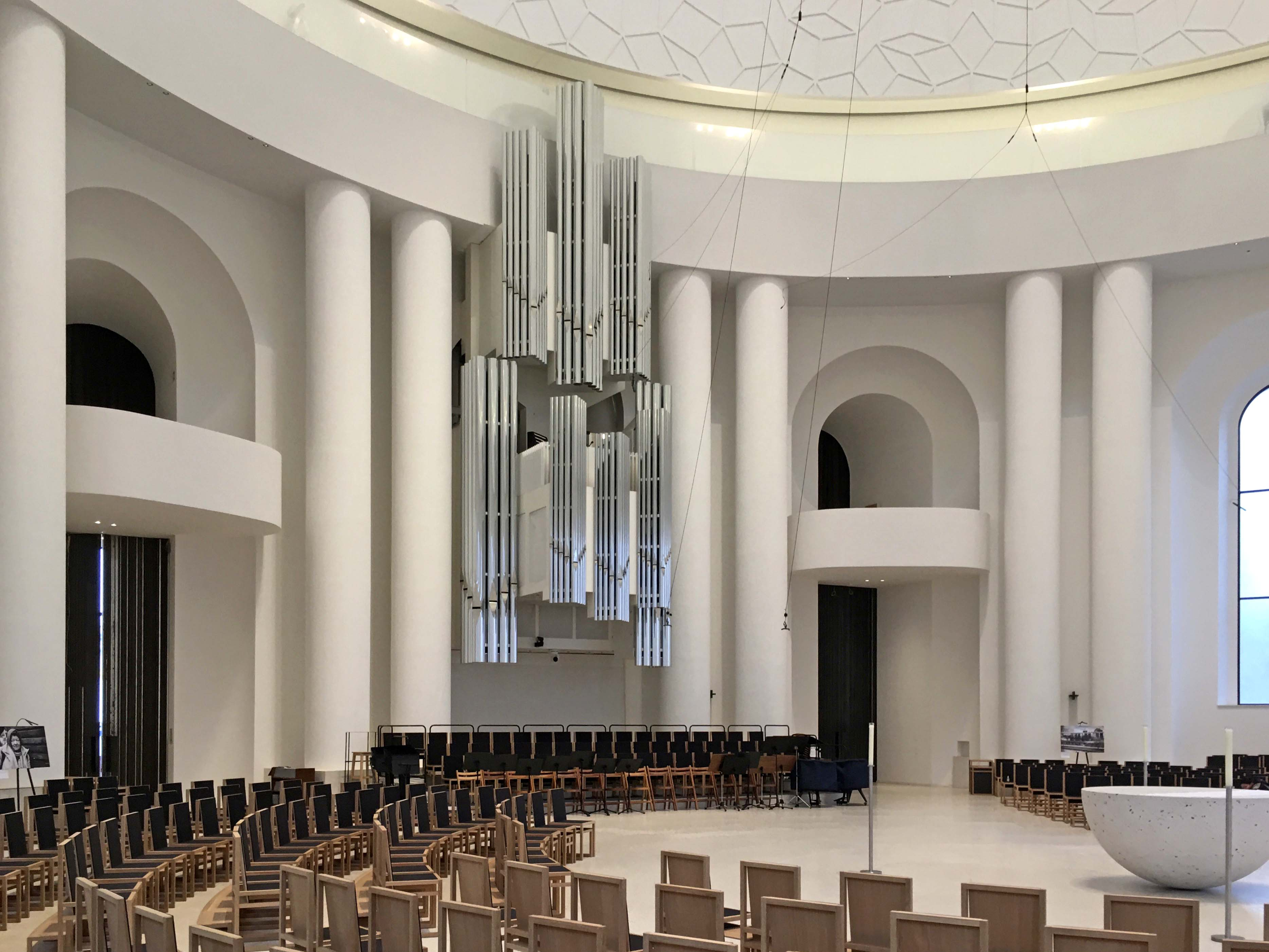
Interior with organ in December 2024

== See also ==
- Religion in Berlin
