= Ringturm =

Skyscraper in Vienna, Austria

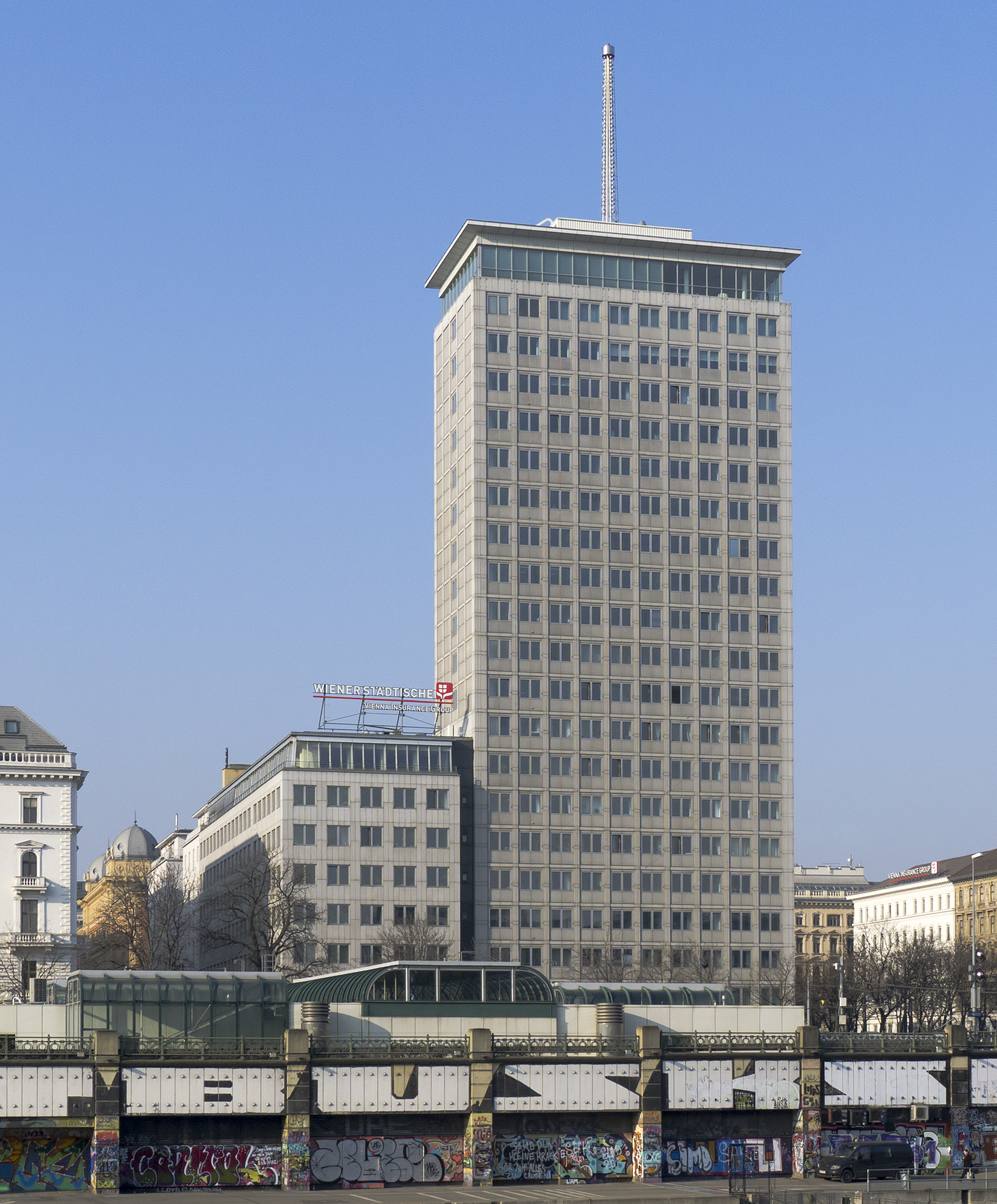
- Ringturm from the Donaukanal

General information
- Status: Office building
- Type: Skyscraper
- Location: Vienna, Austria
- Coordinates: 48°13′1″N 16°22′13″E
- Construction started: 1953
- Completed: 1955
- Opening: 1955
- Owner: Vienna Insurance Group

Height
- Height: 73 m (240 ft)

Technical details
- Floor count: 23
- Floor area: 12,000 m^{2} (130,000 ft^{2})

Design and construction
- Architect: Erich Boltenstern

Distant view of the Ringturm from the east-southeast

Ringturm (Ring Tower) is a prominent skyscraper in Vienna, Austria, and is the headquarters of the Vienna Insurance Group. It was built from 1953 to 1955 after a design by Erich Boltenstern at the Schottenring. The tower is 73 m (240 ft) tall, with 12,000 m^{2} (130,000 ft^{2}) of office space, and is the second highest building within the Vienna Ringstraße, after the Stephansdom. It is a venue for architecture exhibitions, and is known for being turned into a piece of art annually, wrapped in cloth designed by notable artists including Robert Hammerstiel, Xenia Hausner, Arnulf Rainer and Mihael Milunović.

== History ==
The Ringturm (ring tower) was built from 1953 to 1955 after a design by Erich Boltenstern at the Schottenring, part of the Vienna Ringstraße. The tower of 73 m (240 ft) was an innovative project when Vienna was reconstructed after World War II. The building was erected on a property that held the only building of the Schottenring demolished in the war. At 23 floors, it is the second highest building within the Vienna Ringstraße, after the Stephansdom. The building has 12,000 m^{2} (130,000 ft^{2}) of office space, and is the headquarters of the Vienna Insurance Group. It also houses offices of the Wiener Stadtwerke. The façade and some other parts were reconstructed in 1996.

=== Name ===
The name was found by a competition. It was chosen from 6,502 suggestions, including City-Haus, Gutwill-Haus, Haus der Gegenseitigkeit, Hoch-Eck, Neues Hochhaus and Sonnblick-Haus.

=== Weather beacon ===
On top of the tower is a weather beacon (Wetterleuchtturm) 20 m (66 ft) in height. Its 117 lamps (39 white, red and green) indicate weather predictions for the following day by partly blinking and moving combinations. It is connected to the ZAMG (Zentralanstalt für Meteorologie und Geodynamik), the centre for weather forecast on the Hohe Warte. The top has two aircraft warning lights.

Beacon indicators

- red lights increasing in luminosity = rising temperature
- red lights decreasing in luminosity = falling temperature
- green lights increasing in luminosity = improving weather
- green lights decreasing in luminosity = worsening weather
- green lights with uniform luminosity = steady weather
- red lights blinking = storm warning
- white lights blinking = snow or black ice

=== Exhibition and events ===
Beginning in 1998, architectural exhibitions have been displayed in the entrance hall free of charge. A series Architektur im Ringturm is focused on architecture of Austria, Central Europe and Eastern Europe. Regular television series of the ORF have been produced in the building, including Lebenskünstler with Helmut Zilk and Kabarett im Turm.

==== Ringturmverhüllung ====
Since 2006, the Ringturm has been transformed into a piece of art each summer by being wrapped in cloth designed by prominent artists from Austria and Eastern Europe. The cloth consists of 30 pieces, each 36 m (118 ft) wide and 63 m (207 ft) long.

The projects have included:

- 2006: Don Giovanni by Christian Ludwig Attersee (on the occasion of a Mozart year)
- 2007: Turm des Lebens by Robert Hammerstiel
- 2008: Turm in Blüte by Hubert Schmalix
- 2011: Familiensinn by Xenia Hausner
- 2012: Gesellschaft by László Fehér from Hungary
- 2013: Verbundenheit by Dorota Sadovská from Serbia
- 2014: Schleier der Agnes by Arnulf Rainer, 16 June to 17 September, for the first time with an exhibition
- 2015: Sommerfreuden by Tanja Deman from Croatia
- 2016: Sorgenfrei by Ivan Exner from the Czech Republic
- 2017: Weitblick (Vision) by Mihael Milunović from Serbia
- 2018: I Saw This by Gottfried Helnwein
- 2019: Zukunftsträume by Daniela Kostova from Bulgaria
- 2020: no wrapping due to the COVID-19 pandemic.
- 2022: With One Other by Dóra Maurer
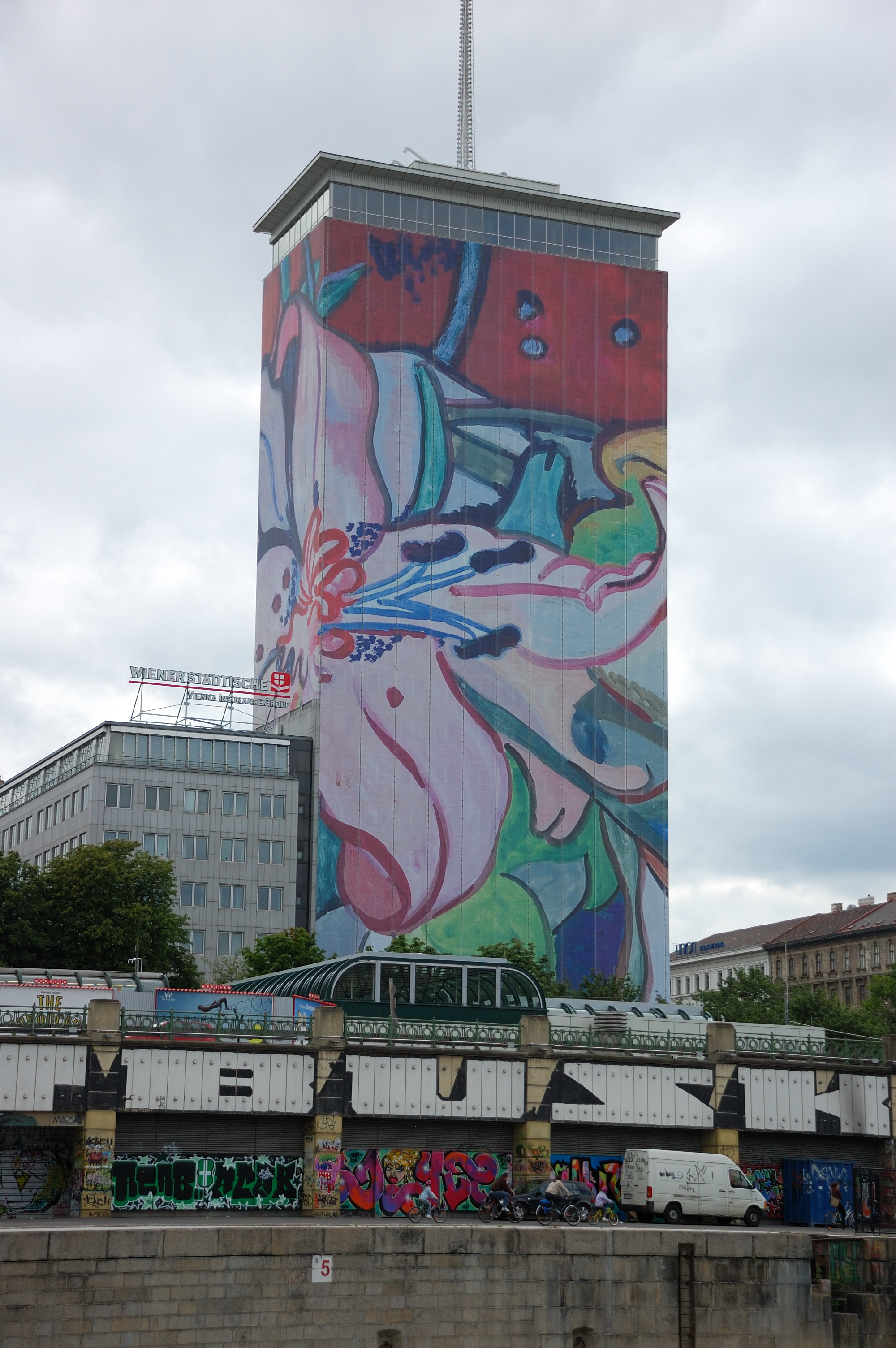
2008

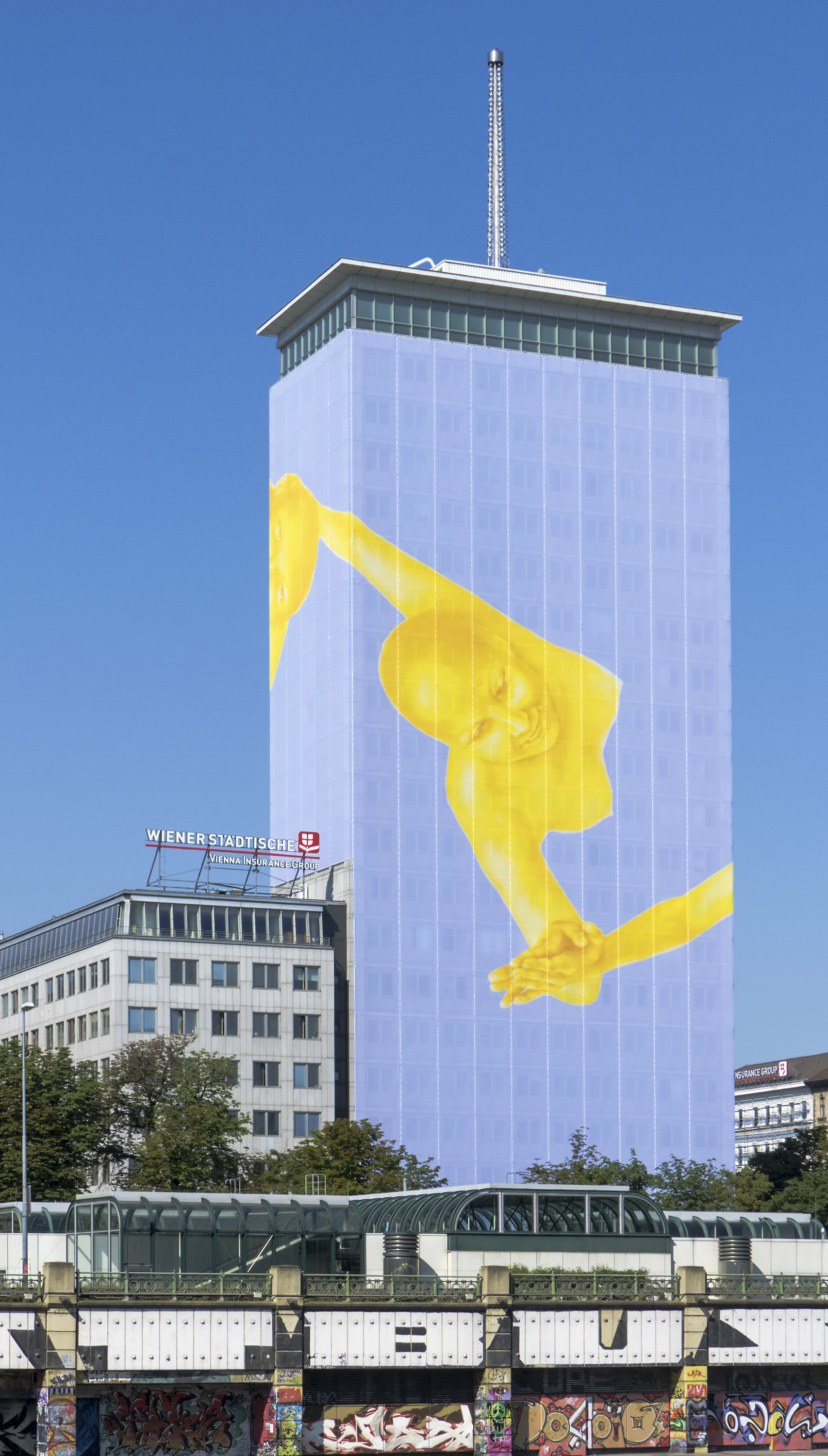
2013

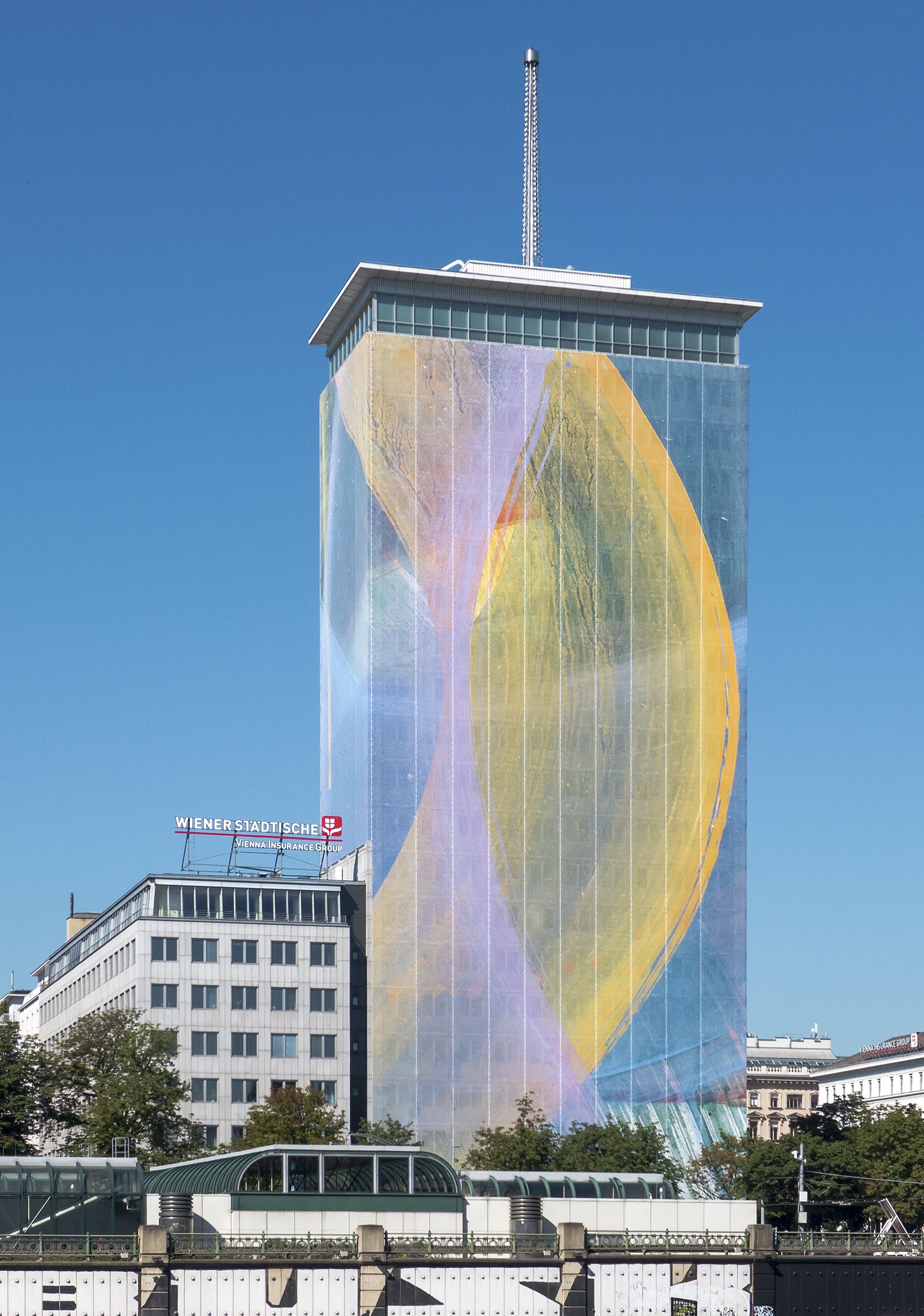
2014

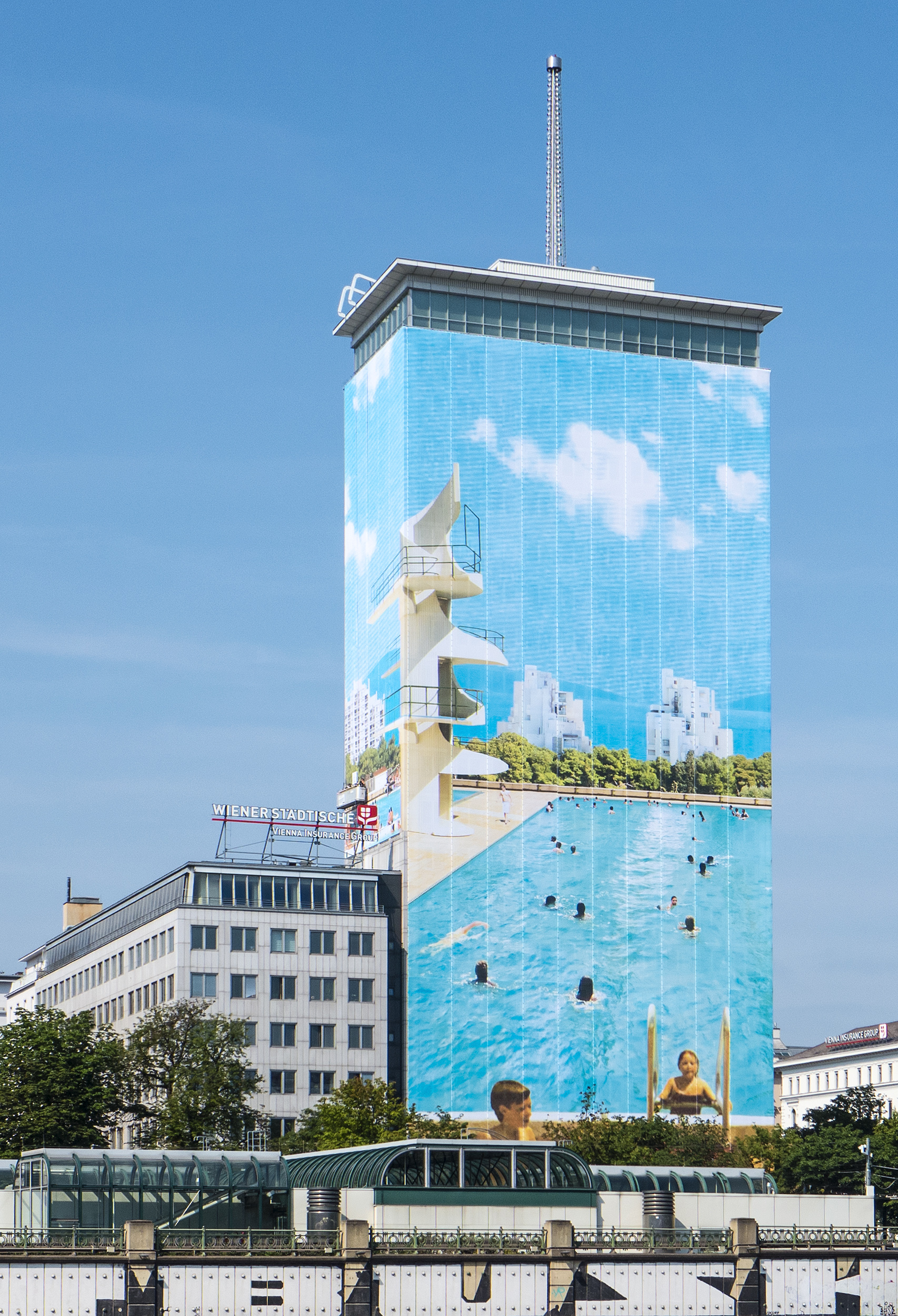
2015

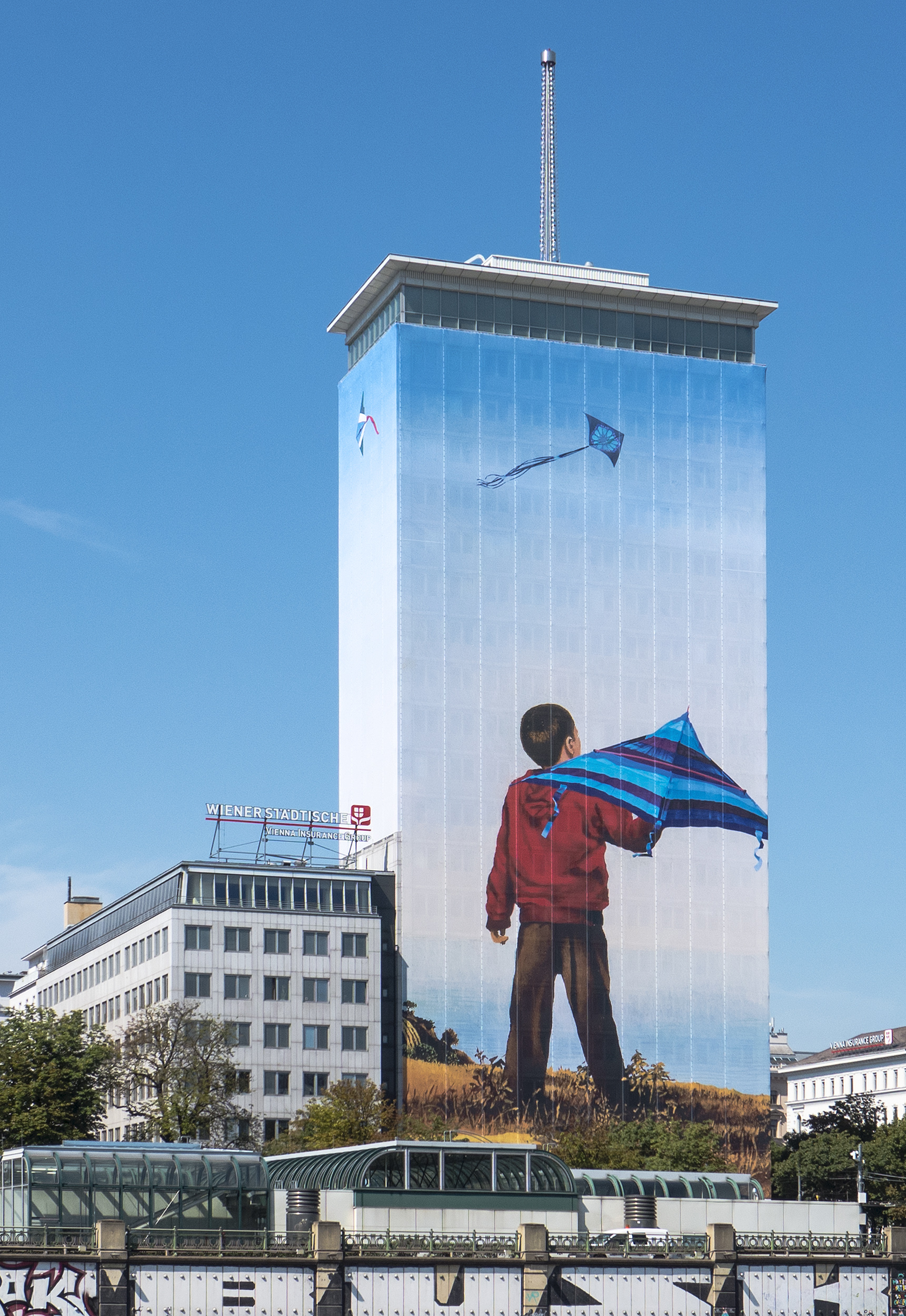
2016

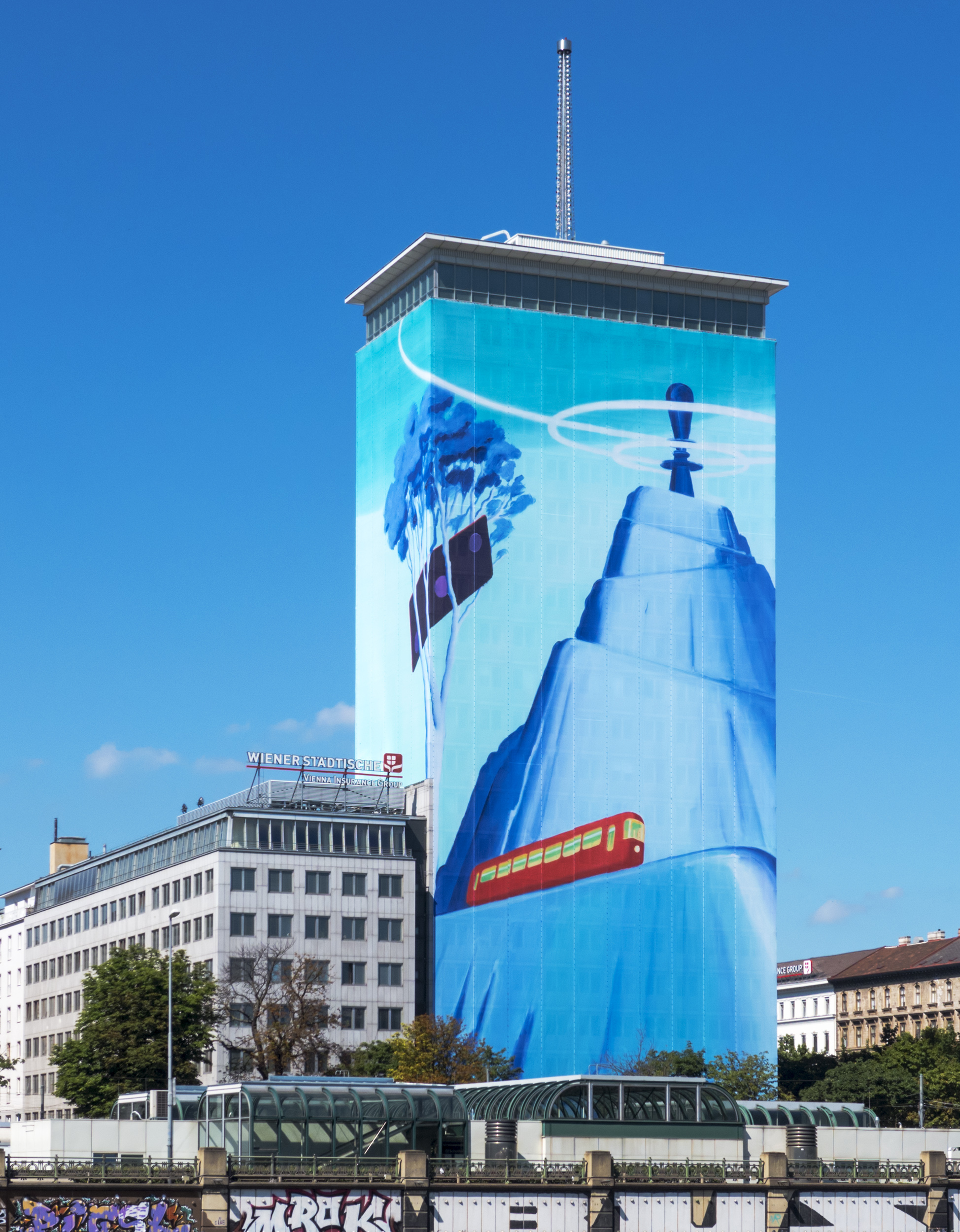
2017

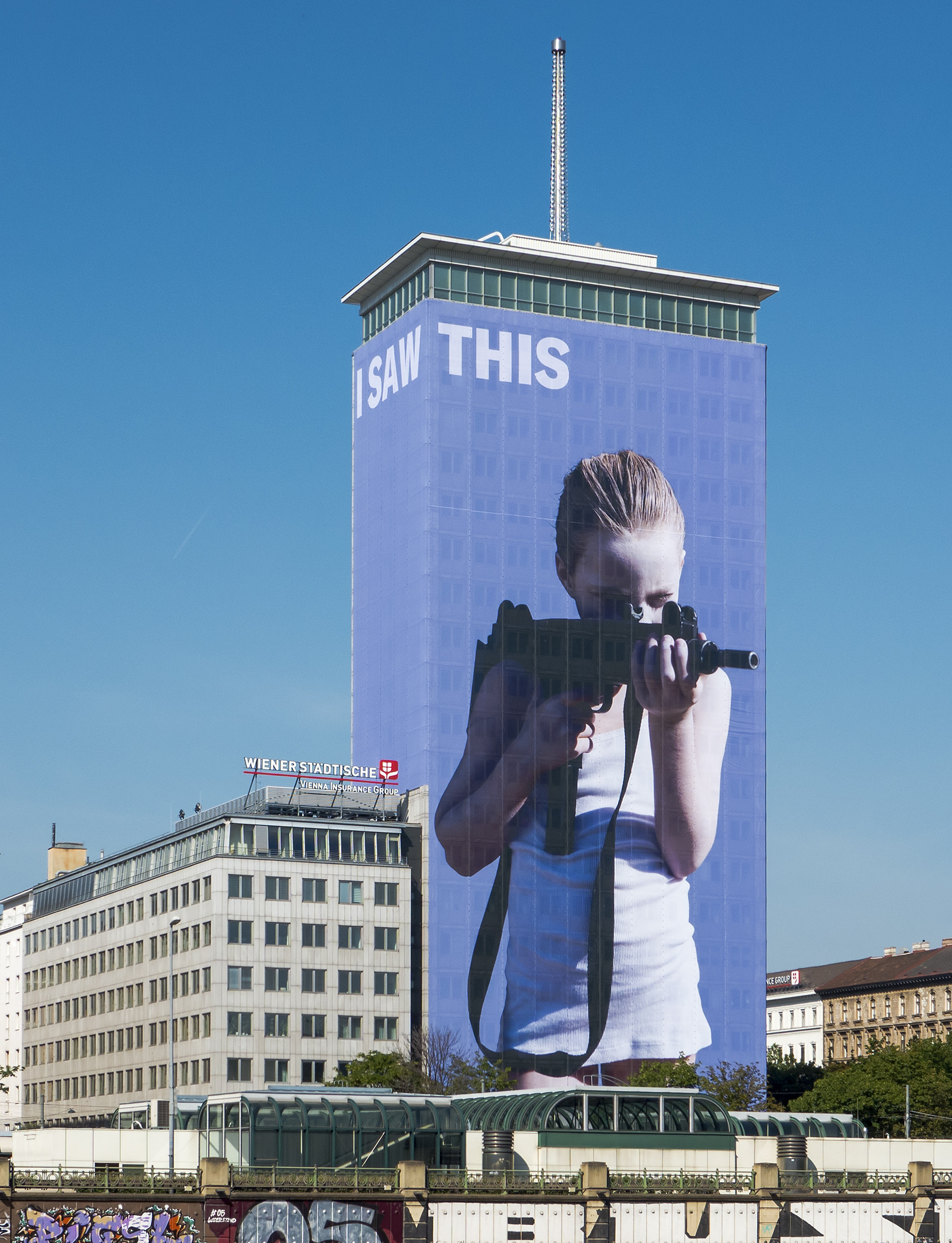
2018

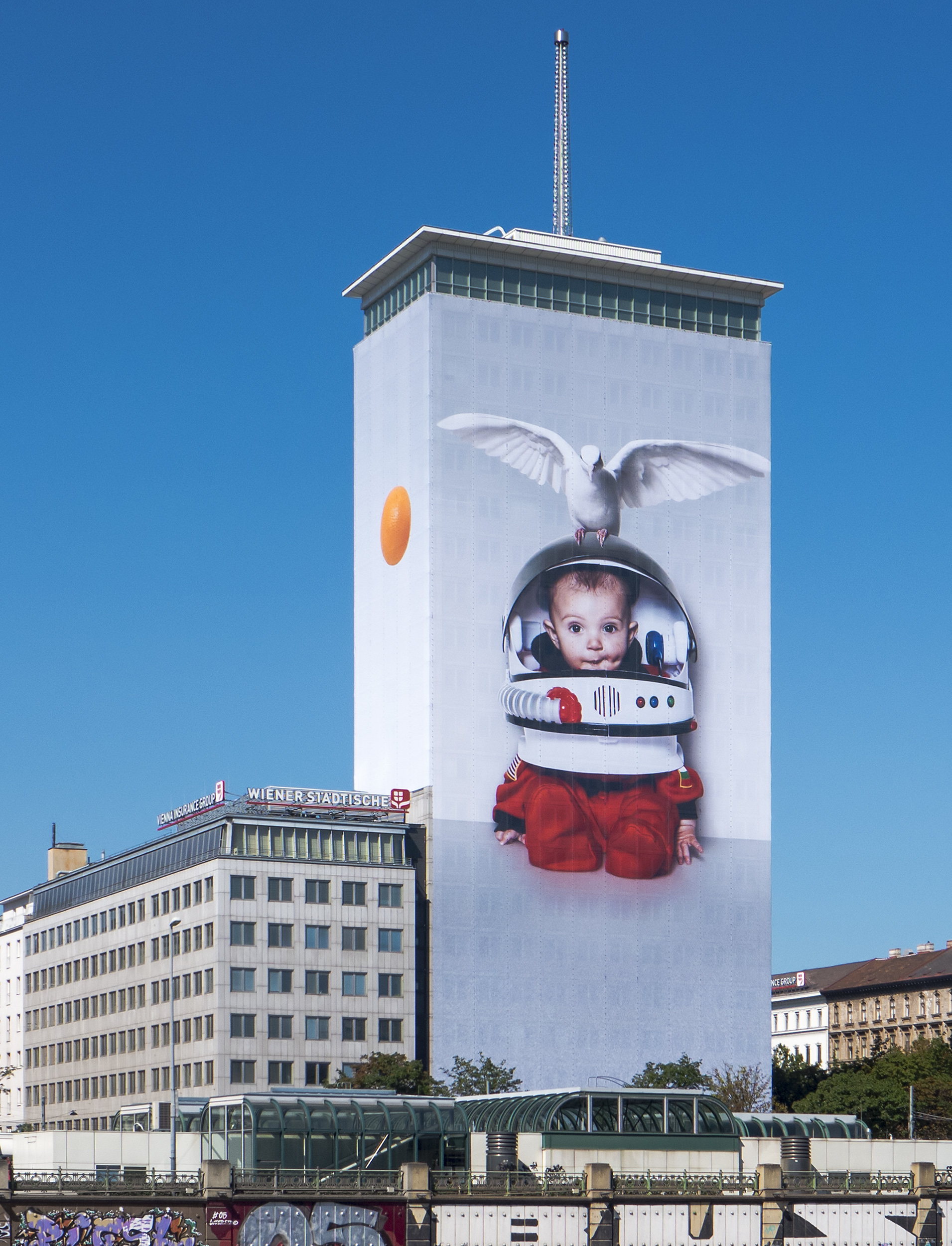
2019
