= Daniela Kostova =

Bulgarian visual artist (born 1974)

- Born: Sofia, Bulgaria
- Known for: Art installations
- Notable work: Adventure Playground, Loose
- Awards: Unlimited Award for Contemporary Bulgarian Art, 2011, International Art Award Onufri in Tirana, Albania, 2000
- Website: www.danielakostova.com

Daniela Kostova (born 1974) is a contemporary Bulgarian visual artist known for her photography and video based installations.

== Life and career ==
Daniela Kostova was born in Sofia, Bulgaria and received her M.F.A. from the Rensselear Polytechnic Institute in New York and the National Art Academy in Sofia. Her works have been exhibited in places such as the Queens Museum of Art, the Institute for Contemporary Art (Sofia), the Kunsthalle Wien (Austria) and others. In 2006, 2007 and 2009 Kostova received travel grants from the New York Foundation of the Arts (NYFA), the American Foundation for Bulgaria and the European Cultural Foundation. In 2011, she won the Unlimited Award for Contemporary Bulgarian Art and at the same year she started together with Stanislava Georgieva the Bulgarian Artists in America (BAA). In 2016 Kostova exhibited as an A.I.R. Gallery Fellow and was a resident at the Center for Art and Urbanism (ZK/U) in Berlin. In 2019 curator Philippe Batka selected one of Kostova's works for the 12th year of wrapping the Ringturm building in Vienna, Austria. Kostova lives and works in New York City. She is the Director of Curatorial Projects at Radiator Gallery and a Board Member of the CEC Artslink exchange program.

Kostova was Director and curator of Irida Art Gallery in Sofia, Bulgaria (2000–03).

== Works and installations ==
Kostova's work addresses issues of geography and cultural representation. In 2004 Kostova's installation Fixing Reality was created by placing a large blue screen in several public settings in the United States. The screen digitally projected images of her home country Bulgaria in an attempt to bridge the geographic and social gaps between the two countries.

In 2019 her art work “Cosmonaut 1001″ which features a baby astronaut with communist and capitalist patches on its suit and a white dove sitting on his helmet, was selected as part of the public installation project Future Dreaming to cover the Ringturm building in Vienna. The artistic wrapping of the building was officially opened on 26 June at a ceremony attended by Austrian Foreign and Culture Minister Alexander Schallenberg and Bulgaria’s Deputy Culture Minister Amelia Gesheva. The 4,000 square meter artwork was covering the facade of the Ringturm facing the Danube Canal in the center of Vienna throughout the summer of 2019, comprising a total of 30 printed sheets, each around 3 meter wide and up to 63 meter long.

A recurring topic in Kostova's work is the perception of "Safe Play" and what it stands for in different cultures and social contexts. Her installations "Adventure Playground" and "Loose" are both covering this topic. In 2017 her installation “Stuck” which was a large-scale photo-mural, was commissioned for the exhibition “Shifting Layers” at the Sofia City Art Gallery in Bulgaria. The installation was a reflection on living conditions affected by climate change, and the realization that things can dramatically turn overnight, shifting from play into tragedy.

== Selected exhibitions ==
- Future Dreaming, public installation, 2019, Ringturm building, Vienna
- The Higher Ground, site-specific installation, 2018, Shoestrings Gallery, NYC
- Adventure Playground, site-specific installation, 2017, Cindy Rucker Gallery, NYC
- Stuck, site-specific installation, 2017, Sofia City Gallery
- Loose, site-specific installation, 2016, A.I.R. Gallery, NYC
- It's Delovely, site-specific installation, 2015, Academic Gallery, NYC
- Play Date, site-specific installation, 2015, Backerstrasse4 Gallery, Vienna
- Flip-House, site-specific installation, 2013 Queens Museum of Art
- Site-specific installation, 2008, Estacion Indianilla Museum, Mexico
- Site-specific installation, 2005, Kunsthalle Wien, Vienna
