= Hubert Schmalix =

Austrian painter (1952–2025)

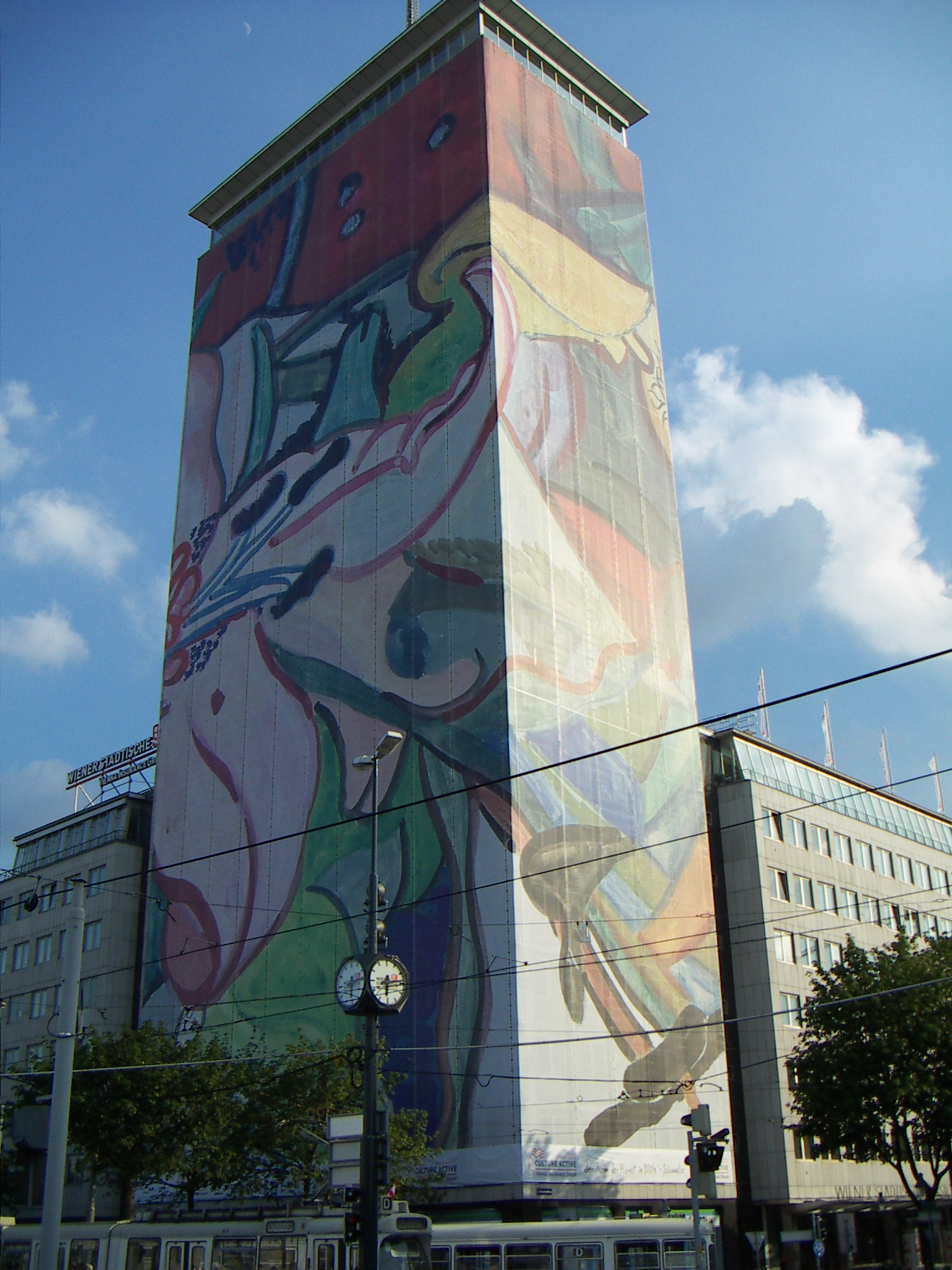
- Der Turm der Kunst in Blüte, outside the Ringturm in Vienna
- Born: 17 December 1952; Graz, Styria, Austria
- Died: 23 March 2025 (aged 72); Los Angeles, California, U.S.
- Education: Academy of Fine Arts Vienna
- Occupation: Painter

Hubert Schmalix (17 December 1952 – 23 March 2025) was an Austrian painter.

== Biography ==
Born in Graz on 17 December 1952, Schmalix studied at the Academy of Fine Arts Vienna from 1971 to 1976 under the instruction of Maximilian Melcher. In 1976, he gave his first personal exhibition at the Vienna Künstlerhaus. In 1983, he participated in aktuell ’83 in Munich and subsequently travelled to Australia and the Philippines. In 1987, he moved to Los Angeles. From 1997 to 2006 he taught at the Academy of Fine Arts Vienna and the University of California, Los Angeles.

Schmalix died in Los Angeles on 23 March 2025, at the age of 72.

== Awards ==
- City of Vienna Prize for Fine Arts (1998)
- Medal of Honor of the State of Styria for Science, Research and Art (2024)
