= Robert Hammerstiel =

Austrian painter and engraver (1933–2020)

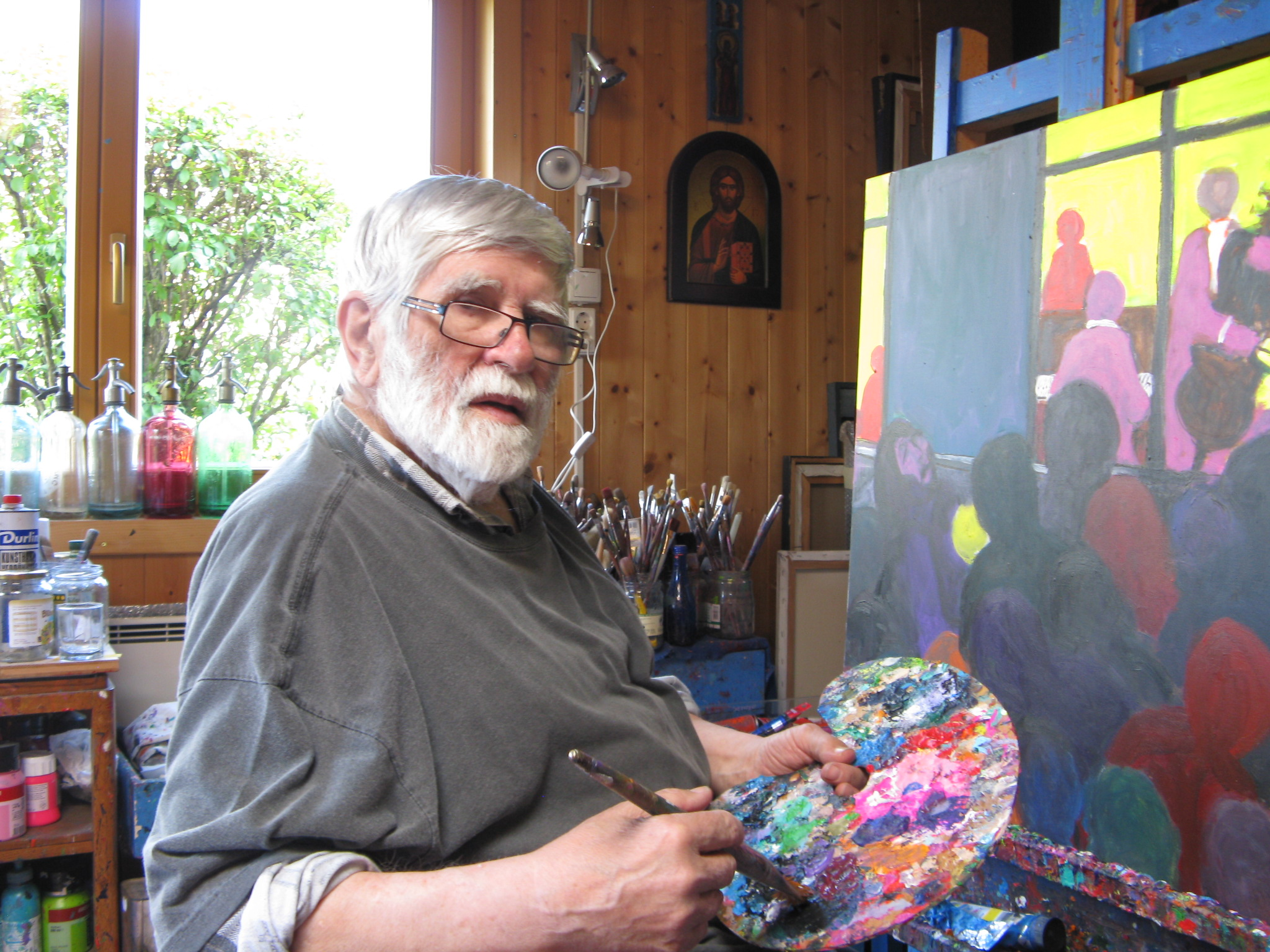
- Robert Hammerstiel in his studio in Pottschach (Ternitz) 2017
- Born: 18 February 1933; Vršac, Kingdom of Yugoslavia
- Died: 23 November 2020 (aged 87); Neunkirchen, Austria
- Occupations: Painter; Engraver

Robert Hammerstiel (18 February 1933 – 23 November 2020) was an Austrian painter and engraver. His works are influenced by Serbian icon painting, wood-engraving and pop art. Hammerstiel was internationally recognized and received numerous awards. His home town installed a museum dedicated to his art.

== Life and work ==
Hammerstiel was born in Werschetz/Vršac, Kingdom of Yugoslavia, in a family of German expatriates. His father, Anton Hammerstiel, was a baker who also painted icons; his mother was Therese Hammerstiel, née Schiff. He attended German and Serbian primary schools. Towards the end of World War II, the Germans were expelled. Hammerstiel was deported to Zichydorf internment camp; his mother to a different camp. In 1947, he escaped with his mother and brother, first to Hungary where they lived from charity. They moved further to Austria. In Ternitz in Lower Austria, they lived in the village Pottschach, where Hammerstiel remained a resident for life. Hammerstiel became an apprentice to be a baker in 1949. When his father, who had been held as a prisoner of war, returned in 1950, he interested his son in painting and drawing, and also instructed him in icon painting. Robert Hammerstiel painted portraits and landscapes of the surroundings. He completed the baker's training in 1951 but from 1955 worked in the local steel industry. The following year, he married Margareta Speringer.

Hammerstiel took part in a competition of the Austrian Federation of Trade and won a prize, which resulted in his studies of art. Parallel to his work, he began to study at the Wiener Kunstschule in 1959, first with Gerda Matjeka-Felden, and from 1963 to 1965 with Robert Schmitt, Gerhard Swoboda, August Swoboda and Hans Stockbauer. His topics, beginning in the 1960s, became faceless figures. He exhibited internationally from 1974. In 1985, he was awarded the honorary title Professor.

In 1988, he left his work in the steel industry and became a freelance artist. His works were exhibited in the Austrian Culture Institute in New York City, where he was exposed with American painting, and used radically bright colours for his compositions. He was the author of Von Ikonen und Ratten: Eine Banater Kindheit 1939 – 1949 (with 32 woodcuts, Brandstaetter: Vienna, 1999); and illustrator of several books including Des Bischofs Kleid by Luisa Owens (2013). In 2007, he wrapped the Ringturm in Vienna with a painting measuring 4,000 m^{2} (43,000 sq ft). It shows stations of human life in simplified and brightly-coloured figures.

Hammerstiel was an honorary member of the Vojvodinian Academy of Sciences and Art. He died in Pottschach on 23 November 2020 at the age of 87.

His birth town dedicated a museum to his works in 2010. Andrea Mayer, Secretary of State in the Ministry of Culture of Austria, described his work as unique in the Austrian art scene, based on many regional traditions.

== Exhibitions ==
Source homepage.

- 1973 Landesmuseum Niederösterreich, Vienna
- 1982 Vienna Künstlerhaus
- 1988 Austrian Institute, New York City
- 1991 Museum of Modern Art, Cairo
- 1993 Vienna Künstlerhaus
- 2002 National Museum, Vršac
- 2006 Leopold Museum, Vienna
- 2007 Vienna Künstlerhaus
- 2008 Ständige Vertretung des Landes Baden-Württemberg at the EU, Brussels
- 2009 Leopold Museum, Vienna

== Works ==
- Berlin, Germany House.
- Braunschweig, HAUM.
- Brugg, Gallery.
- New York.
- Cairo, Museum of Modern Art.
- Klosterneuburg / Lower Austria, Essl Collection.
- Madrid, Thyssen-Bornemisza Museum.
- New York, Austrian Culture Institute
- Novi Sad, Vojvodjanski muz.
- Recklinghausen, KH.
- Reutlingen, municipal KM donation house.
- Rome
  - Vaticani Museum, Coll. d'Arte Relig. Mod.
  - Centro Artist. Cult.
- Salzburg, MdM Rupertinum.
- Sofia, Municipal KG.
- St. Pölten, Lower Austria. LM.
- Tokyo, NM of Western Art.
- Vršac, H.-Mus.
- Vienna
  - ABK.
  - Albertina.
  - City Department of Culture.
  - Leopold Museum
  - Austrian Gallery Belvedere.
  - Federal collection.
  - Rudolf Leopold Collection.
  - Wiener Städtische Versicherung collection.

== Awards ==
- 1973: Austrian State Prize for Graphics
- 1998: Austrian Decoration for Science and Art
- 2005: Knight of the Order of St. Sylvester (Pope John Paul II)
- 2005: Golden Laurel of the Society of Artists in Austria, Vienna Künstlerhaus
