= Mihael Milunović =

Montenegrin artist

- Born: July 2, 1967 (age 58); Belgrade, Yugoslavia
- Education: University of Arts in Belgrade; École nationale supérieure des Beaux-Arts
- Known for: Painting, Sculpture, Drawing, Photography
- Movement: Underrealism
- Website: www.mihaelmilunovic.com

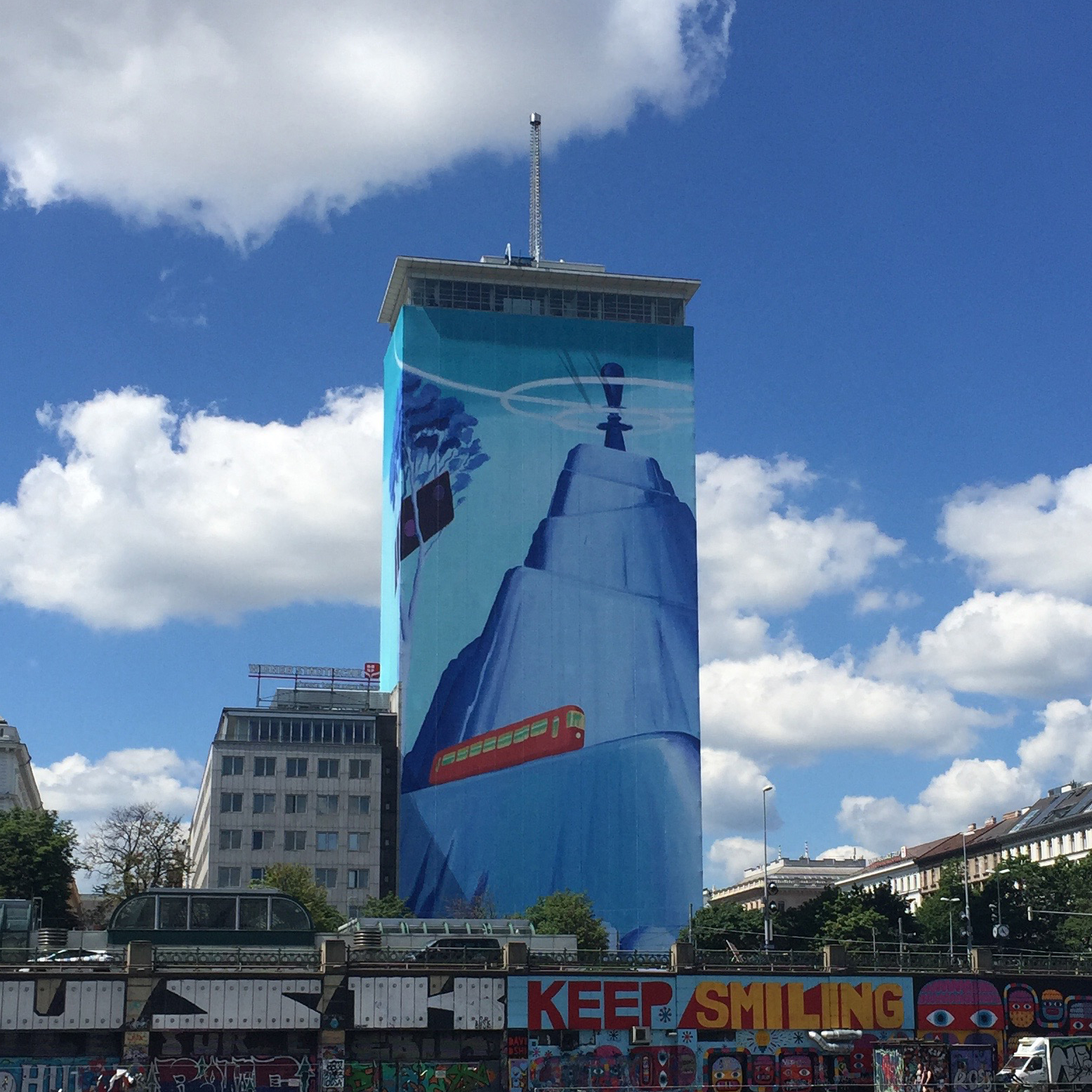
Mihael Milunović's work "Vision", Ringturm "wrapping", Vienna, 2017

Mihael Milunović (born July 2, 1967) is a Serbian and French painter. His work encompasses a wide range of artistic disciplines, from painting, drawing and photography through large-scale sculptures, installations, to sound, video and objects. His main interests focus on social and political issues. By decontextualizing everyday objects, symbols or situations, Milunović provokes unease in the observer, a blend of alienation and curiosity.

In 2018, he obtained the prestigious Award from the French Académie des Beaux-Arts for his painting work.

His works are featured in prestigious museum collections including MUMOK, Vienna; Museum of Contemporary Art, Belgrade; Palazzo Forti, Verona; and Musée d’Art et d’Industrie, Saint-Étienne, France. He has participated in numerous individual and group exhibitions, among others: MUMOK Ludwig Museum Vienna; Galerie Nationale du Jeu de Paume, Paris; Musée d'art moderne (Saint-Étienne); Museum of Contemporary Art, Belgrade; The Stedelijk Museum, Aalst, Belgium; Esterhazy Foundation Schloss Esterházy, Eisenstaedt; Musee d'Art Modeste, Sete; PAN Naples; The Kunsthalle Fridericianum, Kassel; The Biennials in Poznań and Valencia; Wiener Secessionsgebäude, in Vienna, and others. In June 2017, Milunović's work "Vision/Blue Mountain" covered the highest building in Vienna over 4,000 square metres (43,000 ft^{2}), the Ringturm, seat of Vienna Insurance Group, marking the ten-year jubilee of this company's art project "Wrapping of Ringturm". The ceremony was opened with a speech of Sebastian Kurz, Minister of Foreign Affairs of Republic of Austria.

== Early life and education ==
Milunović was born in Belgrade, to Nikola Kolja Milunović and Ana Viđen. His father is a well known Serbian sculptor and first son of Milo Milunović (1897–1967), a Montenegrin painter that dabbled in both Impressionism and Cubism and was one of the founders of Academy of Arts, Belgrade in 1937. His mother Ana Viđen was a sculptor of Croatian origin.

Milunović studied painting at the University of Arts in Belgrade and at the École nationale supérieure des Beaux-Arts in Paris, France. In 1996 he was awarded Laureate of the prestigious Prix de la Fondation Renoir.

== Period 1999–2009 ==
Soon after his return to Paris, in 2000 he exposed his works in Galerie Nationale du Jeu de Paume, within the exhibition "L'autre moitié de l'Europe", in a part curated by dr. Lorand Hegyi. Milunović met Lorand Hegyi during the show, and the long term collaboration was born. Milunović artworks were included the next year (2001) in MUMOK Museum Ludwig in Vienna, Austria and consequently in Collection Siemens AG in Vienna. He debuted with the Galerie Ernst Hilger, and continued working with him until 2004.

Between 2001 and 2003, Milunović participated in the Biennale of Valencia in 2003, together with Roman Opalka, Dennis Oppenheim and Ilya Kabakov. During this period Milunović also collaborated on number of exhibition projects with Cité des Sciences in Paris.

Milunović moved from Paris to Saint-Étienne in France's, central region, where he developed projects with the École supérieure d'art et design Saint-Étienne, where he held an experimental class, and also many artistic and exhibition projects; he participated in several museum shows in Musée d'art moderne (Saint-Étienne) in 2004 (Passage d’Europe together with Anri Sala, Dan Perjovschi, Simon Hantai) and 2005 (Domicile, with Jan Fabre and others). He traveled and exhibited in South Korea (2006) and Italy, notably in Palazzo d'Arte di Napoli (PAN), and started working with Gallery Changing Role in Naples, Italy and Galerie Georges Verney-Carron in Lyon, France.

In 2006 he founded NGO ProArtOrg that organised the first Belgrade show of an important American artist since the war in Yugoslavia 1991–1995. It was the show of Dennis Oppenheim followed by a series of lectures given by Thommas Messer, director emeritus of Guggenheim Foundation and dr. Lorand Hegyi, then director of Musée d'art moderne (Saint-Étienne). In 2007 he opened a show "Uncomfortable Realities" in Galerie Piece Unique in Paris, France, showing new sculptural works and works on paper. The show gained great attention. In 2008 he started a collaboration with Galerie Guy Baertschi from Geneva. In 2009 he moved again to Paris, only to complete a large sculptural work entitled "Mothership", realised with a group of de-scolarised children in Saint-Étienne and with a help of NGO Paria and city of Saint-Étienne.

== Period 2009–2017 ==
At the end of 2009 Milunović moved to Brussels. He started to paint large scale paintings that were shown in Museum of Contemporary Art Belgrade in 2014, and consequently became part of important art collections (Collecion Solo, Wiener städtische, Esterhazy). In 2015 he returns to Paris, where he lives and works since.

== Education ==
1987–1995 University of Arts in Belgrade (Bachelor of Arts and Master of Arts in Fine Arts).
1995–1996 Specialized Studies at École nationale supérieure des Beaux-Arts (ENSBA), Paris, France, class of professor Vladimir Veličković.

== Exhibitions ==
Group shows: MUMOK Ludwig Museum Vienna; Galerie Nationale du Jeu de Paume, Paris, France; Musée d'art moderne (Saint-Étienne), France; Museum of Contemporary Art, Belgrade, Serbia; Stedelijk Museum, Aalst, Belgium; Esterhazy Foundation, Eisenstaedt, Austria; Musee d'Art Modeste, Sete, France; PAN Naples, Italy; The Kunsthalle Fridericianum, Kassel, Germany; The Biennials in Poznań, Poland and Valencia, Spain; Wiener Secessionsgebäude, in Vienna, Austria and others.

Individual exhibitions: Museum of Contemporary Art, Belgrade, Serbia, Fondazione Mudima, Milan, Italy; Gallery Piece Unique, Paris, France; Galerie Art Baertschi & Co, Geneva, Switzerland; Georges Verney Carron, Lyon, France; Voice Gallery, Marrakech, Morocco and others.

== Collections ==
His works are present in the permanent collections of the MUMOK – Museum Ludwig in Vienna; Musee d'Art et d'Industrie, Saint-Étienne, France; Collection Moët & Chandon, LVMH, France; Collection Siemens AG, Vienna, Austria; Sammlung Esterhazy, Eisenstadt, Austria; Museum of Contemporary Art, Belgrade, Serbia; Collecion Solo, Madrid; Collection Telenor, Belgrade, Serbia; Collection Renoir, France; Collection Maya Picasso, France; Collection Leube, Salzburg; Collection Palazzo Forti, Verona, Italy; Collection Azraq – foundation Alliances, Marrakech, Morocco; Collection Barzai-Hollander, Brussels; Collection Wiener Städtische, Austria and Serbia; as well as in many other private and public art collections around the world.
