= Leo Zogmayer =

Austrian artist

Leo Zogmayer (born 1949) is an Austrian artist, living and working in Vienna and Krems.

== Work ==
Zogmayer was born in Krems an der Donau, Lower Austria. He studied at the University of Applied Arts in Vienna from 1975 to 1981 in Herbert Tasquil's class. He works in various media including drawing, graphic arts, photography, computer drawings, painting, glass painting, sculpture (wood, iron, aluminum, concrete) and creates art projects in various architectural and urban contexts (New York; Vienna, St. Veit/Salzburg, St. Pölten/Austria; Sonnenhausen, Tübingen/Germany). He has done work in churches (Brussels/Belgium; Frankfurt, Bonn, Aschaffenburg/Germany; Graz, Innsbruck/Austria). Between 1998 and 2000, he led a class for aesthetics in space at the International Summer Academy at Topolcianky/Slovakia.

In the early 1990s, Zogmayer transitioned from narrative and expressive forms of art, such as painting and drawing, to creating installations based on clear stereometric forms. His later works feature words and texts integrated into paintings and glass sculptures, exploring themes such as beauty, intercultural discourse, and spirituality.

== Exhibitions ==
- 2010 Vienna, Museum of Modern Art Foundation Ludwig, Painting – Process and Expansion
- 2006 Krems, Kunsthalle, Leo Zogmayer – beautiful
- 2005 New Delhi, Lalit Kala Akademi, 11. Triennale India
- 2002 Warsaw, National Museum, Semiotic Landscape
- 2001 Vienna, Museum of Modern Art Foundation Ludwig, Discursive Painting
- 2001 Marburg, Kunstverein, Leo Zogmayer – No Image
- 2000 Bratislava, Galéria Medium, Leo Zogmayer – Space Colour Text
- 1996 Rome, Palazzo Braschi, Austriaci a Roma
- 1996 Essen, Museum Folkwang, Positions – Journeys to the Borders of Painting
- 1991 Vienna, Museum of Modern Art Foundation Ludwig, Leo Zogmayer – Sculpture
- 1991 Salzburg, Rupertinum, Leo Zogmayer – Sculpture
- 1991 Essen, Museum Folkwang, Leo Zogmayer – Drawing / Sculpture

== Public collections ==
- Museum of Modern Art Foundation Ludwig, Vienna
- Graphic Collection Albertina, Vienna
- University of Applied Arts, Vienna
- Museum of Modern, Salzburg
- Lentos, Art Museum Linz
- Landesmuseum of Lower Austria, St. Pölten
- Museum Liaunig, Neuhaus
- Museum Folkwang, Essen
- Hedendaagse Kunst, Utrecht
- Museum of Contemporary Art, Seoul
- Espace de l'Art Concret, Mouans-Sartoux
- Fonds d'art contemporain de la Ville de Genève
- Museo de Bellas Artes, Santander

== Literature ==
- Erste Worte. Gedanken zu Leo Zogmayers Wortbildern. Karl Baier, in: Den Menschen im Blick. Phänomenologische Zugänge. Würzburg 2012

Vom Ausrahmen der Welt. Schauen als Ortsbezogenheit in der Kunst Leo Zogmayers. Dieter Willim. Unpublished dissertation, University Vienna 2010 Project Vienna. How to React to a City. Museum für Applied Arts. Vienna 2010

- Leo Zogmayer, Is your journey really necessary? Galerie Vertice. Text: Fernando C. Flórez, Oviedo 2008
- Leo Zogmayer, schön/beautiful. Kunsthalle Krems. Talk Leo Zogmayer, Tayfun Belgin. Krems 2006
- Leo Zogmayer. Wort-Ding-Bild. Dombergmuseum Freising. Texte: Peter Steiner, K. Baier. Freising 2006
- 11th Triennale India, The Austrian Contribution. Text: Carl Aigner. New Delhi 2005
- Leo Zogmayer. Galerie Medium, Bratislava u. Museum of Modern Art, Passau. Texte: F.X. Baier, Mária Orisková. Bratislava 2000
- Leo Zogmayer. Verknüpfende Trennungen. Text: Rainer Fuchs. Klagenfurt 1997
- Positionen – Reisen an die Grenzen der Malerei. Museum Folkwang Essen. Essen 1996
- Leo Zogmayer, Skulpturen. Museum moderner Kunst Wien, Rupertinum Salzburg und Museum Folkwang Essen. Texte: Gerhard Finckh, Lóránd Hegyi, *Henriette Horny, Dieter Ronte. Wien 1991
- Leo Zogmayer, Zeichnungen 1986 - 1991. Museum Folkwang Essen. Texte: Hubertus Froning, Andrea Hofmann. Wien 1991
