= Lorenz Weinrich =

German historian (1929–2025)

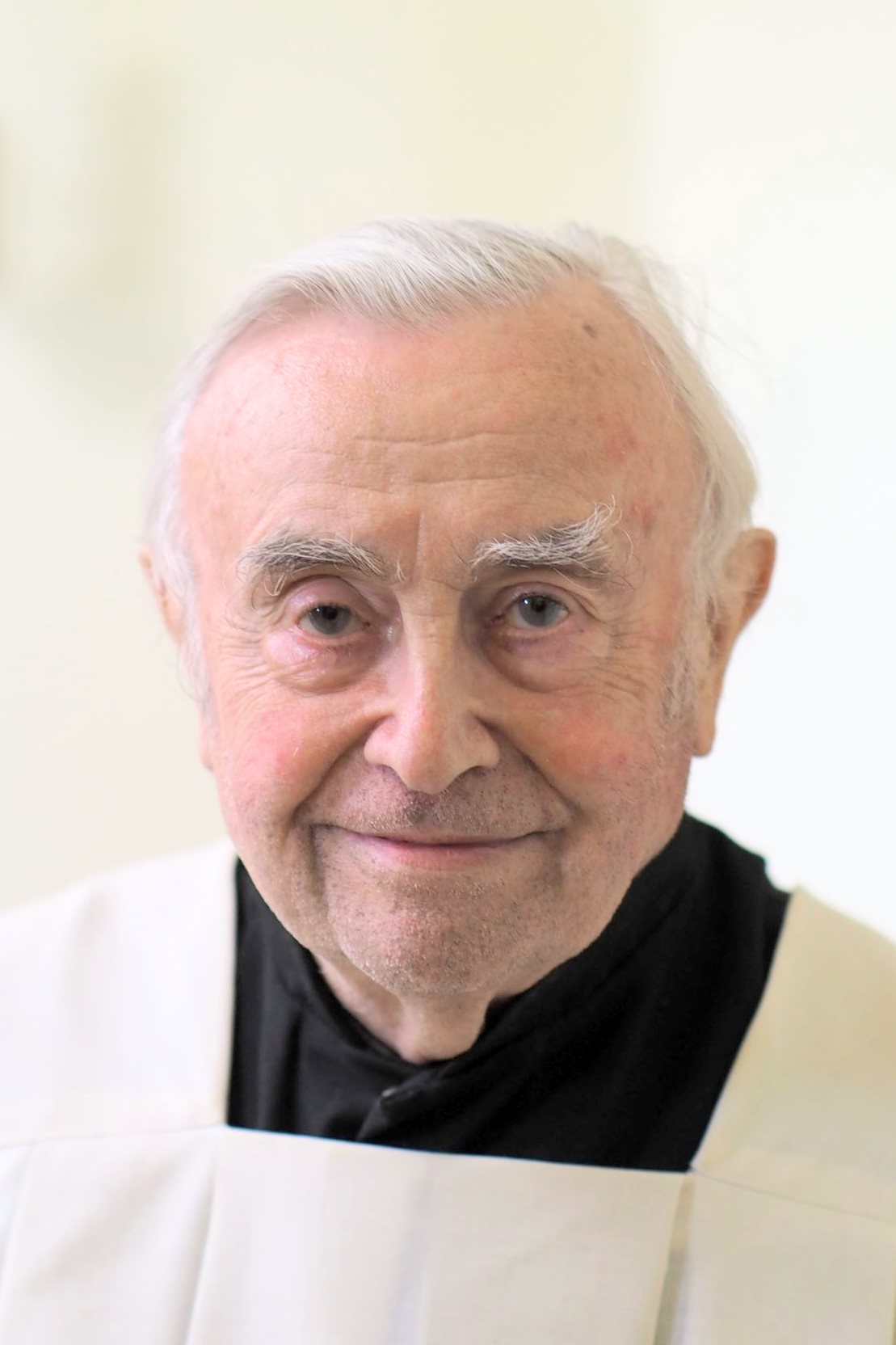
- Weinrich in 2015
- Born: 20 August 1929; Salzwedel, Saxony, Prussia
- Died: 27 November 2025 (aged 96); Berlin, Germany
- Awards: Order of the Holy Sepulchre

Academic background
- Education: Free University of Berlin

Academic work
- Discipline: Historian
- Sub-discipline: German history

Lorenz Hubert Weinrich (20 August 1929 – 27 November 2025) was a German historian and academic who served as the dean of the faculty of history at the Free University of Berlin from 1987 to 1989. He led the Gregorian schola of Mater Dolorosa in Lankwitz from 1952 to 2002 and served in other functions in the parish. He was chair of the board of the Association for Christian-Jewish Cooperation in Berlin from 1980 to 1992.

== Life and career ==
Weinrich was born in Salzwedel, Province of Saxony, on 20 August 1929. After completing school with the Abitur in 1948, he studied history and classical philology at the Free University of Berlin, and he earned his doctoral degree in 1954 with a study on Wala of Corbie.

After working as a teacher at different schools in Berlin, he became an Academic Advisor at the Friedrich Meinecke Institute at the Free University in 1962. In 1967/1968, he was a visiting scholar for Medieval Latin and German at the University of Chicago. He habilitated in 1971 at the Free University in history. In 1973 and 1974, he taught Gregorian chant and liturgical chant at the Episcopal University for Church Music Berlin. In 1980, he lectured at Saarland University in Saarbrücken. From 1987 to 1989, he was Dean of the faculty of history at the Free University.

In 1975, Weinrich was invested into the Order of the Holy Sepulchre. Since 1979, he was Commander of the order. In 2013, he was appointed as commander of the Order of St. Sylvester with star.

Since 1977, Weinrich was a member, and from 1979 and 1980 vice chair, and from 1980 to 1992 chair, of the board of the association Gesellschaft für Christlich-Jüdische Zusammenarbeit in Berlin (Association for Christian Jewish co-operation in Berlin). In 1986, he was elected as a board member of the Deutscher Koordinierungsrat der Gesellschaften für Christlich-Jüdische Zusammenarbeit and 1987 he was its chair. In this capacity, he presented the Buber-Rosenzweig-Medal to Yehudi Menuhin in 1989.

Weinrich conducted the Gregorian scholae of the Roman Catholic parish Mater Dolorosa in Lankwitz from 1952 to 2002. He was a member of the Pastoral council for decades, and until 2007, he was a member of the management board of the parish. In this capacity he was co-founder of the foundation Stiftung Mater Dolorosa Berlin-Lankwitz in 2006.

Weinrich died in Berlin-Tempelhof on 27 November 2025, at the age of 96.

== Publications (selection) ==
Monographs

- Wala – Graf, Mönch und Rebell. Lübeck und Hamburg 1963 (Karolingische Studien Heft 386). Dissertation. OCLC 831144483
- Das ungarische Paulinerkloster Santo Stefano Rotondo in Rom (1404–1579). Berliner historische Studien. vol. 12, Ordensstudien, Berlin, Duncker und Humblot 1998. ISBN 3-428-09334-8.

Editor and translator

- with Herbert Helbig: Urkunden und erzählende Quellen zur deutschen Ostsiedlung im Mittelalter. Darmstadt 1968. OCLC 874363449
- Quellen zur deutschen Verfassungs-, Wirtschafts- und Sozialgeschichte bis 1250 (= Ausgewählte Quellen zur deutschen Geschichte des Mittelalters. vol 32). Wissenschaftliche Buchgesellschaft, Darmstadt 1977, ISBN 3-534-01958-X.
- Toleranz und Brüderlichkeit: 30 Jahre Gesellschaft für Christlich-Jüdische Zusammenarbeit in Berlin. Berlin, Gesellschaft für Christlich-Jüdische Zusammenarbeit 1979. OCLC 174448975
- Quellen zur Verfassungsgeschichte des Römisch-Deutschen Reiches im Spätmittelalter (1250–1500). Freiherr-vom-Stein-Gedächtnisausgabe 33, Darmstadt 1983, ISBN 3-534-06863-7.
- Pfarrkirche und Gemeinde Mater Dolorosa Berlin-Lankwitz 1912–1987, Berlin 1987. OCLC 934465438
- with Jürgen Miethke: Quellen zur Kirchenreform im Zeitalter der großen Konzilien des 15. Jahrhunderts. Erster Teil: Die Konzilien von Pisa (1409) und Konstanz (1414–1418). Darmstadt 1995. ISBN 978-3-534-06876-0 OCLC 929269596
- Quellen zur Reichsreform im Spätmittelalter. Ausgewählte Quellen zur deutschen Geschichte des Mittelalters. vol. 39. Wissenschaftliche Buchgesellschaft, Darmstadt 2001, ISBN 3-534-06877-7.
- Heiligenleben zur deutsch-slawischen Geschichte. Adalbert von Prag und Otto von Bamberg. Ausgewählte Quellen zur deutschen Geschichte des Mittelalters. vol. 23. Wissenschaftliche Buchgesellschaft, Darmstadt 2005, ISBN 3-534-01422-7.

Essays

- Laurentius-Verehrung in Ottonischer Zeit. In: Jahrbuch für die Geschichte Mittel- und Ostdeutschlands, vol. 21. 1972.
- Der Slawenaufstand von 983 in der Darstellung des Bischofs Thietmar von Merseburg. In: Dieter Berg, Hans-Werner Goetz (eds.): Historiographia Mediaevalis. Studien zur Geschichtsschreibung und Quellenkunde des Mittelalters. Festschrift für Franz-Josef Schmale zum 65. Geburtstag. Wissenschaftliche Buchgesellschaft, Darmstadt 1988, pp. 77–87.
