= Blech (disambiguation) =

Blech may refer to:

== People ==
- Benjamin Blech, American orthodox rabbi
- David Blech (born 1955), American businessman
- Gustavus M. Blech (1870–1949), American physician
- Hans Christian Blech (1915–1993), German actor
- Jörg Blech (born 1966), German journalist and author
- Leo Blech (1871–1958), German opera composer and conductor

== Other ==
- Blech, a metal sheet used by Jews to cover stovetop burners
- Brass instruments (Blech in German)
- Blech, a synchronous programming language
- Blex
