= Post-traumatic embitterment disorder =

- Specialty: Psychiatry, Clinical psychology
- Symptoms: Severe emotional and behavioral symptoms in response to a single adverse life event; recurring intrusive thoughts; avolition; dysphoric-aggressive-depressive mood; unspecific somatic symptoms; phobic avoidance of persons or places related to the triggering event; fantasies of aggression and revenge towards the stressor
- Usual onset: immediately following the triggering event
- Duration: > 6 months
- Causes: one singular traumatic event perceived as insulting, humiliating or unjust
- Risk factors: lack of psychological resilience
- Diagnostic method: Based on symptoms
- Differential diagnosis: Post-traumatic stress disorder, Major depressive disorder, Adjustment disorder, Phobia, Personality disorders, Paranoia, Delusions, Schizotypal disorder, Schizophrenia, Querulant delusion, Moral injury
- Treatment: Counseling, wisdom therapy
- Prognosis: good if treated in time, poor without treatment

Post-traumatic embitterment disorder (PTED) is a pathological response to a single adverse life event perceived by the affected individual as a serious insult, humiliation, or injustice. The predominant emotions are persistent embitterment, anger, and hatred, particularly toward the triggering stressor, often accompanied by intrusive memories of the event and fantasies of revenge. The disorder emerges immediately following the triggering event. Unlike "ordinary" adjustment disorders, which usually subside within six months, PTED typically becomes chronic. The prognosis is generally unfavorable without treatment, as affected individuals may become trapped in a vicious cycle of mutually reinforcing negative emotions and thoughts.

In addition to the classic form of PTED triggered by a single event, a 2018 study identified three additional forms of pathological embitterment: non-reactive embitterment, or embitterment-prone personality, where no specific trigger can be identified; secondary embitterment, which occurs in the context of other mental disorders; and complex embitterment, which—analogous to complex PTSD—develops over time in response to repeated stressors. The clinical significance of these forms remains debated. However, more recent studies suggest that complex post-traumatic embitterment may be both more common and more severe than classic PTED.

PTED is not yet recognized as a distinct clinical disorder in the current medical classification systems ICD-11 and DSM-5. In both systems, PTED may be classified as an adjustment disorder. In ICD-11, however, an embitterment reaction is for the first time explicitly named under adjustment disorders.

In psychiatry and clinical psychology, as well as the legal system, individuals affected by embitterment disorders have long been referred to as querulants. As early as 1915, German psychiatrist Emil Kraepelin described “querulous delusions” (German: Querulantenwahn) in his textbook of psychiatry, characterizing them as a form of “traumatic neurosis” (German: traumatische Neurosen) distinct from personality disorders. PTED as a separate disorder was first proposed by German psychiatrist and psychologist Michael Linden in 2003. Although a growing body of research has added to the construct in recent years, the nosological validity of PTED remains disputed.

== Bitterness and embitterment ==
Bitterness (also known as resentment) is a basic human emotional response to experiences of injustice, betrayal, or humiliation, involving feelings such as anger, wrath, hostility, disappointment, disgust, and shame. However, while bitterness is considered a transient emotion that eventually fades, embitterment is defined as a prolonged state of bitterness that does not easily subside and may severely impair quality of life. Typically, emotions associated with embitterment will recur every time the triggering event is recalled.

== Prevalence ==
There is little empirical evidence as to the prevalence of embitterment and PTED in the general population. In a nationally representative prevalence study conducted in Germany, 11.7% of respondents reported moderate levels of embitterment, while 3.8% reported high levels. Among those with high levels of embitterment, at least 7.2% were so severely affected that they required support in their everyday lives. Respondents with the highest levels of embitterment were less likely to have completed secondary education, more likely to be unemployed, more often on sick leave, and had on average lower incomes. The proportion of Muslims was considerably higher among those with severe embitterment than among those with low levels of embitterment (11.6% vs. 2.8%), whereas the proportion of people with no religious affiliation was significantly lower (20% vs. 27.3%). There were no significant differences between the groups in terms of age, sex, household size, or occupation. By far the most commonly reported cause of embitterment was an injustice committed by someone close to the affected person in their personal life, followed by injustices at work or in personal life more generally, injustices caused by an institution, and, lastly, injustices attributed to society.

== Pathogenesis ==
Persistent states of embitterment may arise when an individual’s core beliefs are profoundly violated. In psychology, core beliefs refer to convictions, attitudes, and values shaping a person’s understanding of themselves and the world. They provide a cognitive framework for how someone sees the world, themselves, and others, what they regard as important, how to act in a given situation, and serve as a moral compass. Core beliefs may be either positive or negative. They are important both to individuals and to society and can be passed down through generations, in some cases shaping entire cultures. They do not necessarily reflect reality, but are experienced as real by the individual, regardless of their content. Information that conflicts with these beliefs is therefore often disregarded, making it difficult to change them (confirmation bias). One of the most fundamental core beliefs is the belief in a just world.

Because core beliefs are a crucial part of an individual’s identity, they are particularly susceptible to insult, humiliation, betrayal, and injustice. If a core belief is violated so severely that the experience cannot be ignored or adequately processed, and if the affected individual was not able to defend themselves and their beliefs in that situation, this may lead to PTED, turning initial feelings of helplessness and resignation into embitterment. Since core beliefs differ from person to person, an event one person might dismiss as trivial or a minor annoyance may constitute an existential crisis for another.

== Symptoms and diagnostic criteria ==
PTED is triggered by a single adverse life event perceived as unjust, humiliating, or insulting. This is generally an ordinary, everyday event, such as losing one’s job, bullying, or a conflict with authorities, rather than an extreme event outside the range of usual human experience, such as robbery, a traffic accident, or war. Thus, in PTED, the event is not traumatic because of its objective severity, but because of how the event is subjectively appraised by the affected person (see Transactional model of stress and coping). The precise nature of the event, whether it involves degradation, humiliation, or a breach of trust, does not affect the type of symptoms that result, but may affect their severity.

Because PTED is not currently recognized as a distinct disorder, its diagnostic criteria vary between sources.

A. Essential criteria:

1. A single adverse life event followed by an immediate onset of the disorder.
2. The patient is aware of the trigger and identifies it as the cause of their condition.
3. The triggering event is perceived as unjust, humiliating, and/or insulting.
4. Recurrent emotional distress and feelings of embitterment when the event is discussed.
5. Recurrent intrusive memories; great importance may be placed on not forgetting the event.
6. Emotional responsiveness remains intact; unimpaired emotional regulation when distracted; thoughts of revenge may elicit joy.
7. No manifest mental disorder in the year preceding the trigger; current condition is not a recurrence of a pre-existing mental disorder.

B. Additional symptoms:

1. The patient perceives themselves as a victim, feels helpless and unable to cope with the event or its cause.
2. Self-blame for having failed to prevent the event and for being unable to cope with it.
3. Indifference toward their own well-being; uncertainty whether the emotional wound should even be allowed to heal.
4. Suicidal ideation.
5. Dysphoric-aggressive-depressive mood, resembling depression with somatic syndrome at first glance.
6. Nonspecific somatic complaints (e.g., sleep disturbances, loss of appetite, pain).
7. Phobic avoidance of places or people associated with the triggering event.
8. Reduced or inhibited drive, more in the sense of feeling stuck rather than unwilling.

Additional criteria proposed in different sources include: a querulous persistence in the fight for justice; recurrent thoughts of aggression, revenge, and murder-suicide directed toward the stressor; clinically significant distress or impairment in social, occupational, or other important areas of functioning, as well as subjective well-being; a duration of at least six months.

PTED tends to become chronic, as affected individuals may become caught in a vicious cycle of mutually reinforcing negative emotions and thoughts, which can turn into a self-destructive downward spiral. The disorder is rarely overcome without psychotherapeutic intervention. Without timely and appropriate treatment, there is a substantially increased risk that fantasies of revenge will be acted upon, potentially leading to serious crimes.

== Diagnostic tools ==
=== BEI ===
The Berner Embitterment-Inventory (BEI) (Znoj, 2008; 2011) measures emotional embitterment, performance-related embitterment, pessimism/hopelessness, and misanthropy/aggression.

=== PTED scale ===
The PTED scale is a 19 item self-rating questionnaire and can be used to identify reactive embitterment and assess the severity of PTED. Answers are given on a five-point Likert scale. An average score of 2.5 identifies with a clinically relevant degree of embitterment response, though it does not officially confirm a diagnosis. Higher values are only indications of critical embitterment. The diagnosis of PTED is only possible through a detailed clinical assessment or standardized diagnostic interview.

=== Standardized diagnostic interview ===
The standardized diagnostic interview of PTED asks for core criteria of PTED. In the diagnostic interview, it must be clarified what the patient means when they describe their experiences and feelings.

== Differential diagnoses ==
- Post-traumatic stress disorder:
  - triggered by one singular or several potentially life-threatening, uncommon events causing extreme fear and panic (e.g., road accidents, robberies, war)
  - cardinal emotion is recurring or persisting fear; embitterment does not occur
- Major depressive disorder:
  - very common misdiagnosis due to several symptomatic similarities (e.g., depressed mood, avolition, suicidality, absent-mindedness)
  - contrary to PTED no direct temporal connection to debilitating events, no singular stressor
  - no anhedonia in PTED patients
- Adjustment disorder:
  - normally subsides within six months after the triggering event
  - can be caused by a number of events, not necessarily by insults, betrayal, humiliation or injustice
- Phobia:
  - Avoidance behavior caused by fear, not by embitterment
- Personality disorders:
  - Lifelong development, no immediate connection to a singular event
  - PTED completely reversible by therapy, effects of PDs only mitigable
  - Development of PTED might be facilitated by existing PDs
- Paranoia, delusions, schizotypal disorder, schizophrenia, querulant delusion, moral injury

== Psychotherapy ==
The treatment of posttraumatic bitterness is complicated by the typical resignative-aggressive-defensive attitude of the patient, which is also directed against therapeutic offers. One approach of treatment is wisdom therapy developed by Linden, a form of cognitive-behavioral therapy that aims to empower the patient to distance themselves from the critical life event and build up new life perspectives. One uses the usual cognitive strategies of attitude change and problem-solving are used, such as:

- behavior therapeutic methods like behavioral analysis and cognitive rehearsal
- analysis of automatic thoughts and schemata
- reframing or cognitive reattribution
- exposure treatments
- increase of activities
- rebuilding of social contacts
- promotion of self-effectiveness

A special treatment module aims at the training of wisdom competencies, which means promoting the following abilities:

- changing perspectives
- empathy
- perception and acceptance of emotions
- emotional balance and sense of humour
- contextualism
- long-term orientation
- value relativism
- tolerance of uncertainty
- self-distance and self-relativization

Methodically, the method of "insolvable problems" is used. In this procedure, fictitious serious and insolvable conflict situations are presented, which allow the patients to train wisdom capacities and transfer them to their own situation (so-called "learning transfer.")

== Criticism ==
The problem of embitterment reactions and also the post-traumatic embitterment disorder increasingly gain international attention. Nevertheless, there are some unsolved problems. Further research is needed to differentiate between PTED and other mental disorders. In 2014, science writer Jörg Blech mentioned this disorder in his book Die Psychofalle - Wie die Seelenindustrie uns zu Patienten macht ("The Psycho Trap: How the Mental Health Industry Makes Us Into Patients"), which discussed whether the introduction of PTED might make a problem out of everyday problems.

== Bibliography ==
- Görmez, Aynur; Yeni Elbay, Rümeysa; Karatepe, Hasan Turan (May 2021). "Post-traumatic embitterment symptoms among woman victims of February 28th post-modern coup of Turkey after two decades: A comparative cross-sectional study". International Journal of Social Psychiatry. 67 (3): 269–276. doi:10.1177/0020764020946346. PMID 32727250. S2CID 220877561.
- Muschalla, Beate; Rau, Heinrich; Willmund, Gerd Dieter; Knaevelsrud, Christine (January 2018). "Work disability in soldiers with posttraumatic stress disorder, posttraumatic embitterment disorder, and not-event-related common mental disorders" (PDF). Psychological Trauma: Theory, Research, Practice, and Policy. 10 (1): 30–35. doi:10.1037/tra0000293. PMID 29323524. S2CID 8215595.
- Brennan, Chloe J; McKay, Michael T; Cole, Jon C (May 2022). "Morally injurious events and post-traumatic embitterment disorder in UK health and social care professionals during COVID-19: a cross-sectional web survey". BMJ Open. 12 (5) e054062. doi:10.1136/bmjopen-2021-054062. PMC 9082726. PMID 35523494.
- Simutkin, G. G. (2 November 2018). "Anger attacks and «anger disorders»: clinical relevance, problem of classification, comorbidity and therapy (review)". V.M. Bekhterev Review of Psychiatry and Medical Psychology (3): 10–21. doi:10.31363/2313-7053-2018-3-10-21. S2CID 133538945.
- Ege, Harald (1 November 2008). "Über den Zusammenhang zwischen Mobbing/ Arbeitsplatzkonflikten und dem posttraumatischen Verbitterungssyndrom (PTED): Eine empirische italienische Studie". Psychosomatik und Konsiliarpsychiatrie. 2 (4): 244–247. doi:10.1007/s11800-008-0133-1. S2CID 143281840.
- Karatuna, Işıl; Gök, Sibel (3 April 2014). "A Study Analyzing the Association between Post-Traumatic Embitterment Disorder and Workplace Bullying". Journal of Workplace Behavioral Health. 29 (2): 127–142. doi:10.1080/15555240.2014.898569. hdl:20.500.11857/428. S2CID 145093175.
- Spaaij, Julia; Schick, Matthis; Bryant, Richard A.; Schnyder, Ulrich; Znoj, Hansjörg; Nickerson, Angela; Morina, Naser (December 2021). "An exploratory study of embitterment in traumatized refugees". BMC Psychology. 9 (1): 96. doi:10.1186/s40359-021-00599-2. PMC 8193876. PMID 34112232. S2CID 235397648.
- Shin, Jeonghoon; You, Myoungsoon (19 May 2022). "Embitterment among the unemployed: A multiple mediation model of belief in a just world". Work. 72 (1): 211–220. doi:10.3233/WOR-205228. PMID 35431202. S2CID 248145294.
- Dobricki, Martin; Maercker, Andreas (January 2010). "(Post-traumatic) embitterment disorder: Critical evaluation of its stressor criterion and a proposed revised classification". Nordic Journal of Psychiatry. 64 (3): 147–152. doi:10.3109/08039480903398185. PMID 20148750. S2CID 20643288.
- Linden, Michael (2006). Posttraumatic Embitterment Disorder: Definition, Evidence, Diagnosis, Treatment. Ashland: Hogrefe. ISBN 978-1-61676-344-2. OCLC 1012347668.
- Linden, Michael (7 January 2013). "Hurting Memories and Intrusions in Posttraumatic Embitterment Disorders (PTED) as Compared to Posttraumatic Stress Disorders (PTSD)". In Linden, Michael; Rutkowski, Krzysztof (eds.). Hurting Memories and Beneficial Forgetting: Posttraumatic Stress Disorders, Biographical Developments, and Social Conflicts. Newnes. pp. 83–92. ISBN 978-0-12-398404-3.
- Linden, Michael (2017). Verbitterung und Posttraumatische Verbitterungsstörung. Hogrefe. ISBN 978-3-8017-2822-9. OCLC 971201601.
- Linden, Michael (17 August 2020). "Querulant delusion and post-traumatic embitterment disorder". International Review of Psychiatry. 32 (5–6): 396–402. doi:10.1080/09540261.2020.1747410. PMID 32427007. S2CID 218690718.
- Linden, Michael; Maercker, Andreas (2011). Embitterment: societal, psychological, and clinical perspectives. Wien: Springer. ISBN 978-3-211-99741-3. OCLC 710113250.
- Linden, Michael; Arnold, Christopher Patrick (23 November 2020). "Embitterment and Posttraumatic Embitterment Disorder (PTED): An Old, Frequent, and Still Underrecognized Problem". Psychotherapy and Psychosomatics. 90 (2): 73–80. doi:10.1159/000511468. PMID 33227789. S2CID 227156350.
- Linden, Michael; Noack, Isabel (2018). "Suicidal and Aggressive Ideation Associated with Feelings of Embitterment". Psychopathology. 51 (4): 245–251. doi:10.1159/000489176. PMID 29879700. S2CID 46974208.
- Linden, Michael; Baumann, Kai; Lieberei, Barbara; Lorenz, Constanze; Rotter, Max (2011). "Treatment of Posttraumatic Embitterment Disorder with Cognitive Behaviour Therapy Based on Wisdom Psychology and Hedonia Strategies". Psychotherapy and Psychosomatics. 80 (4): 199–205. doi:10.1159/000321580. PMID 21494061. S2CID 24773913.
- Linden, Michael; Baumann, Kai; Rotter, Max; Schippan, Barbara (2007). "The Psychopathology of Posttraumatic Embitterment Disorders". Psychopathology. 40 (3): 159–165. doi:10.1159/000100005. PMID 17318008. S2CID 25759680.
- Linden, Michael; Baumann, Kai; Rotter, Max; Schippan, Barbara (2008). "Posttraumatic Embitterment Disorder in Comparison to Other Mental Disorders". Psychotherapy and Psychosomatics. 77 (1): 50–56. doi:10.1159/000110060. PMID 18087208. S2CID 23975961.
- Linden, Michael; Baumann, Kai; Rotter, Max; Schippan, Barbara (January 2008). "Diagnostic criteria and the standardized diagnostic interview for posttraumatic embitterment disorder (PTED)". International Journal of Psychiatry in Clinical Practice. 12 (2): 93–96. doi:10.1080/13651500701580478. PMID 24916618. S2CID 43218399.
- Linden, Michael; Baumann, Kai; Lieberei, Barbara; Rotter, Max (March 2009). "The post-traumatic embitterment disorder Self-Rating Scale (PTED Scale)". Clinical Psychology & Psychotherapy. 16 (2): 139–147. doi:10.1002/cpp.610. hdl:20.500.12034/441. PMID 19229838.
- Linden, Michael; Rutkowski, Krzysztof (2013). Hurting Memories and Beneficial Forgetting: Posttraumatic Stress Disorders, Biographical Developments, and Social Conflicts. Amsterdam: Elsevier Science. ISBN 978-0-12-398404-3. OCLC 826854556.
- Linden, Michael; Rotter, Max (January 2018). "Spectrum of embitterment manifestations". Psychological Trauma: Theory, Research, Practice, and Policy. 10 (1): 1–6. doi:10.1037/tra0000307. PMID 29323520. S2CID 37127826.
- You, Myoungsoon; Ju, Youngkee (September 2020). "Modeling embitterment dynamics: The influence of negative life events and social support mediated by belief in a just world". Journal of Affective Disorders. 274: 269–275. doi:10.1016/j.jad.2020.05.108. PMID 32469815. S2CID 219104263.
- Bou Khalil, Rami; Guillaume, Sebastien (July 2020). "Is post-traumatic embitterment disorder a yet unknown comorbidity of anorexia nervosa?". Medical Hypotheses. 140 109670. doi:10.1016/j.mehy.2020.109670. PMID 32182559. S2CID 212752178.
- Sensky, Tom (2010). "Chronic Embitterment and Organisational Justice". Psychotherapy and Psychosomatics. 79 (2): 65–72. doi:10.1159/000270914. PMID 20051704. S2CID 33399909.
- Gao, Yuting; Wang, Xiaoyan; Tan, Liangliang; Yang, Ting; Shi, Linhua; Chen, Huanxin; Jiang, Wenhao; Yuan, Yonggui (28 February 2022). "Characteristics of post-traumatic embitterment disorder of inpatients in a general hospital in China". Clinical Psychology & Psychotherapy. 29 (4): 1426–1432. doi:10.1002/cpp.2727. PMID 35187759. S2CID 247010406.
