= Mordlust =

German true crime podcast

Mordlust – Verbrechen und ihre Hintergründe
- Genre: True Crime

Cast and voices
- Hosted by: Paulina Krasa and Laura Wohlers

Production
- Production: ZDF, Funk (episodes 13 to 92)

Publication
- No. of episodes: 200+
- Original release: July 17, 2018

Related
- Website: https://mordlust-podcast.podigee.io/

Mordlust: Verbrechen und ihre Hintergründe ("Bloodlust: Crimes and Their Backgrounds") is a German true crime podcast hosted by journalists Paulina Krasa and Laura Wohlers. Since its launch on 17 July 2018, new episodes were released every two weeks until 17 January 2024, when the releases switched to a weekly schedule.

== History ==
The two hosts had already worked together as TV journalists and were friends privately. As fans of the true crime genre, they had listened to many podcasts themselves and decided to start Mordlust due to a lack of comparable German-language content.

From episode 13 to episode 85, Mordlust was available for three years through Funk, the content network operated by ARD and ZDF, making it part of Germany’s public broadcasting system. Clemens Schröder and Jella Ritzen were part of the production team and produced the podcast together with the two hosts for Funk, on behalf of ZDF. This division of labor was intended to give Krasa and Wohlers more time for research and for social media platforms such as Instagram, while remaining ad-free. In episode 85, released in 2021, they announced their separation from Funk.

Since episode 86, published on 5 January 2022, advertisements have been included in each episode.

In 2023, Mordlust won the German Podcast Award in the category Publikumspreis Wissen (Audience Award in the category of Knowledge).

== Content ==
=== Intro ===
Each episode begins with a short musical intro, followed by an introduction of the hosts and a lead-in featuring stories from their daily lives or updates to previous episodes. From episodes 13 to 85, the intro continued with a mention of their former production partner, Funk. Since episode 86, they instead mention their own company, Partner in Crime.

Since episode 14, this intro has been expanded with a fixed text in which both hosts have a set speaking part. There, the concept of the podcast and the overarching theme of the respective episode are briefly explained, followed by a note on how the two hosts deal with true crime.

On the different streaming platforms where Mordlust is available, each episode is accompanied by a short description summarizing the content and the featured cases. In addition, almost every episode includes trigger warnings in the show notes, indicating the specific timeframes during which violent acts are described, so listeners can skip those parts if they prefer.

=== Concept ===
In each episode, the hosts tell each other about a true German criminal case related to a specific overarching theme, which they have researched beforehand and which the other host is not yet familiar with. Their sources for the cases include books, documentaries, articles, or other podcasts.

In some episodes, interviews are conducted with people affected by the case. These are either quoted or played in the respective episode.

After presenting the case, the hosts analyze the crime, its background, the perpetrator’s motive, and potential psychological traits. This section is referred to as the "AHA-Moment." In this portion, the hosts often interview experts such as psychologists or lawyers.

To conclude the episode, they once again discuss the presented cases in relation to the episode’s overarching theme and explore legal aspects such as prosecution or sentencing, trial proceedings, and the functioning of the German justice system.

== Shows ==
=== Live performances ===
- At the beginning of 2019, Mordlust held a series of live performances in Cologne, Munich, Berlin, and Hamburg.
- On 10 July 2019, the first live episode took place in Erlangen.
- In November 2021, they started the Mordlust – Partner in Crime Tour 2022, during which Paulina and Laura performed 17 shows in various German cities. The tour began on 23 November 2021, in Berlin and ended on 27 March 2022, in Düsseldorf.

== Reach ==
Mordlust ranked as the most popular German true-crime podcast as of February 2024.

The podcast has an Instagram page, regularly sharing posts about episodes, updates on past cases, and information about live events and guest appearances.
