= Johannes Pinsk =

German Catholic theologian and professor

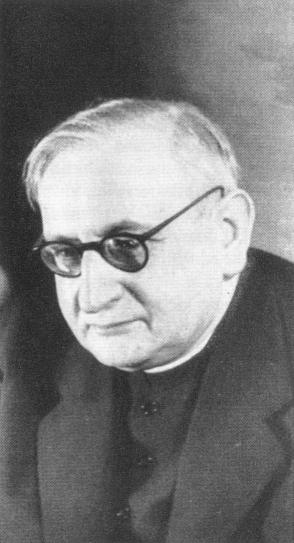
Johannes Pinsk

Johannes Pinsk (4 February 1891 in Szczecin – 21 May 1957 in Berlin-Dahlem) was a German Catholic theologian and professor.

Pinsk studied theology in Breslau (now Wrocław) and was ordained priest 13th Juni 1915. In 1923 he got his doctorate in theology.

In 1928 he moved to Berlin, where he was busy in the area of pastoral care and spiritual guidance of academics. From 1939 to 1954 he led the parish Mater Dolorosa in Berlin-Lankwitz. After that he became professor at the Free University of Berlin. He wrote hundreds of articles, and several books.

He died during a wedding in Berlin-Dahlem in 1957 by a heart attack.
