= Michael Linden =

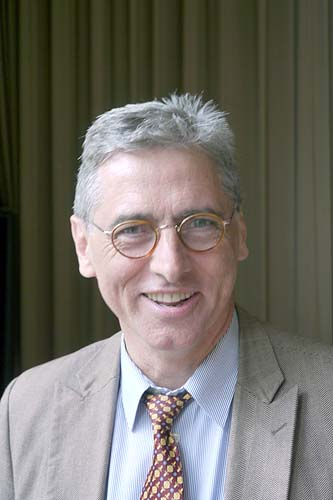
Michael Linden in June 2010

Michael Linden (born 30 July 1948 in Simmern/Hunsrück in Rheinland-Pfalz) is a German psychiatrist and professor of psychiatry, psychosomatic medicine and psychotherapy in the Charité University Hospital in Berlin.

He was the first publishing on Post-traumatic embitterment disorders. Furthermore, he is editor of the journals Primary Care Psychiatry, Rehabilitation, Pharmacopsychiatry and the Journal of Cognitive Psychotherapy. In 1997 he was the recipient of the Research Award in Psychogeriatrics of the International Psychogeriatric Association.

He is married with Evelyn Linden and has two sons and one daughter. He is member of the Roman-Catholic parish of Mater Dolorosa in Berlin-Lankwitz and, he was member of the board of directors of the legal, independent foundation Stiftung Mater Dolorosa Berlin-Lankwitz from 2009 to 2014.

== Publications ==
- The Posttraumatic Embitterment Disorder, Linden, M., Rotter, M., Baumann, K., Lieberei, B. (editors), Hogrefe & Huber-Verlag, 2007
