= Johann Baptist Gradl =

German politician (1904–1988)

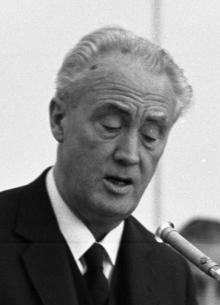
Johann Baptist Gradl (1966)

Johann Baptist Gradl (25 March 1904 – 2 July 1988), was a German politician and member of the Christian Democratic Union who was born and died in Berlin.

During the Weimar Republic Gradl was a member of the Zentrumspartei and he was its president in Berlin-Kreuzberg from 1930 to 1933.

In 1945 Gradl was among the founders and the leaders of the East German Christian Democratic Union in Berlin and the Soviet occupation zone. At the end of 1947 he was dismissed by the Soviet occupation forces and he joined the CDU in West Berlin.

From 1957 to 1980, he was a member of the German Bundestag. Between 1965 and 1966 he was federal government minister for displaced and war-damaged persons. In 1966 he became federal minister for all-German issues in the second cabinet of chancellor Ludwig Erhard. After Erhard's death he became father of the house of the Bundestag. He was the first father of the house born in the 20th century.

Gradl was married to Marianne Brecour, and they had four children. He was a member of the Catholic parish of Mater Dolorosa in Berlin-Lankwitz and he is buried in a tomb of honour in Berlin-Tempelhof.
