= Viehweger =

Viehweger is a German surname. Notable people with the surname include:

- Axel Viehweger (born 1952), German housing cooperative functionary and politician
- Barbara Saß-Viehweger (born 1943), German civil law notary, lawyer and politician
