= Mater Dolorosa (Berlin-Lankwitz) =

Roman Catholic parish and church in Berlin-Lankwitz, Germany

Coordinates: 52°25′26″N 13°20′17″E

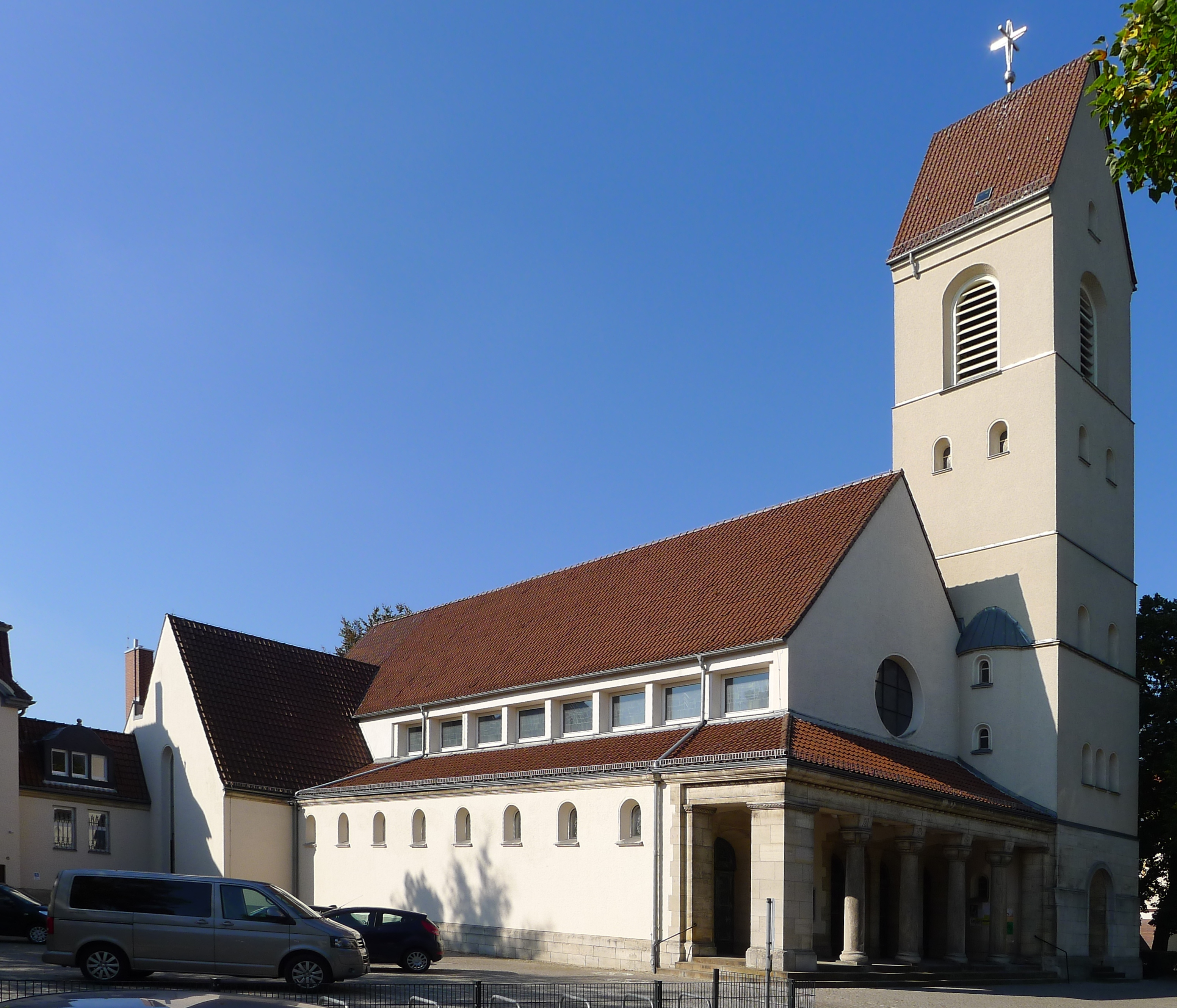
Mater Dolorosa in Berlin-Lankwitz (2014)

Mater Dolorosa is a Roman Catholic parish and church in Berlin-Lankwitz in Germany. Mater Dolorosa belongs to the Roman Catholic Archdiocese of Berlin. It is named after Our Lady of Sorrows (Latin: mater dolorosa).

== Location and urban environment ==
The parish church is located between single and multi-family houses in the western part of the district of Lankwitz, about a kilometre south-east of the regional and suburban railway station Lichterfelde.

== History ==
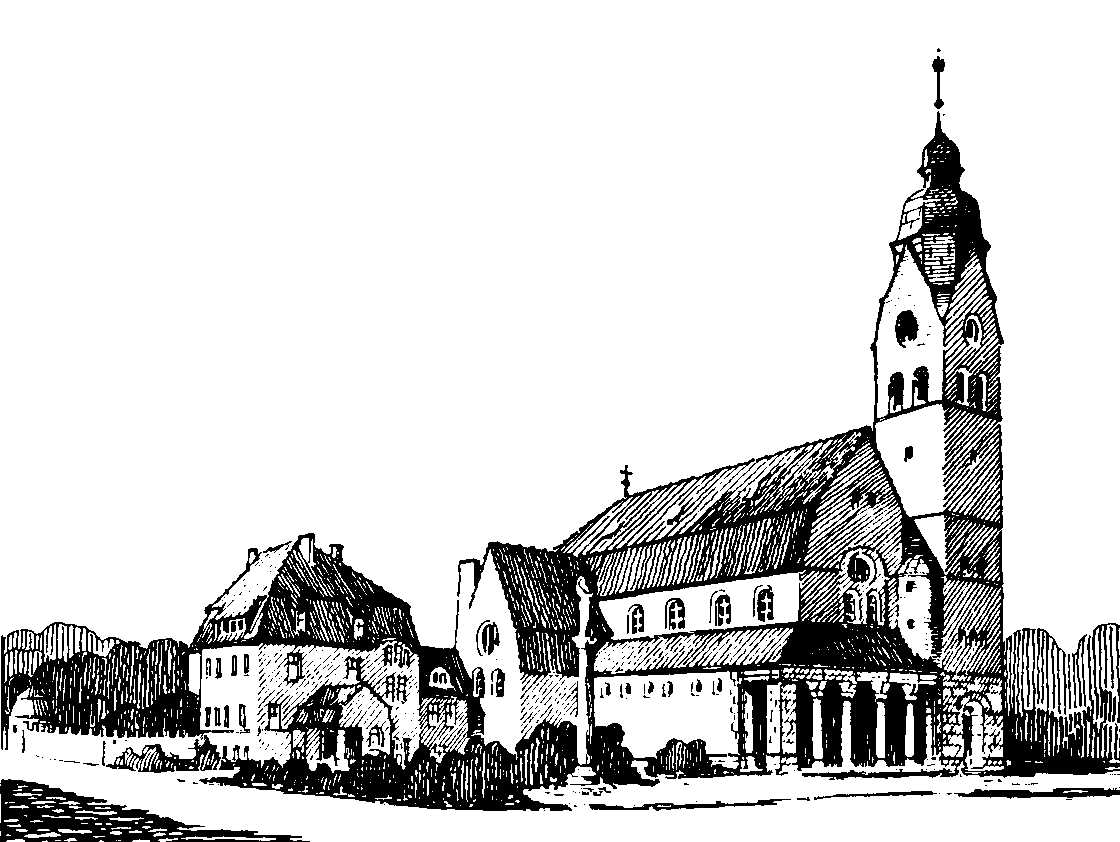
Draft sketch of architects Christoph Hehl and Carl Kühn (1911)

The parish was founded in 1911 and the church was built in 1912 by the Catholic priest Maximilian Beyer of the responsible parent parish in Berlin-Lichterfelde. On 21 May 1921 it became an independent parish. The consecration of the church designed as a basilica by the architects Christoph Hehl (1847–1911) and his scholar and companion Carl Kühn (1873–1942) took place on 22 September 1912 by the Auxiliary Bishop of Breslau Karl Augustin (1847–1919).

== Dedication ==
The consecration is celebrated on the first Sunday in November together with the Catholic cathedral of Berlin, St. Hedwig's Cathedral, which was consecrated on 1 November 1773.

== Destruction and reconstruction of the church ==
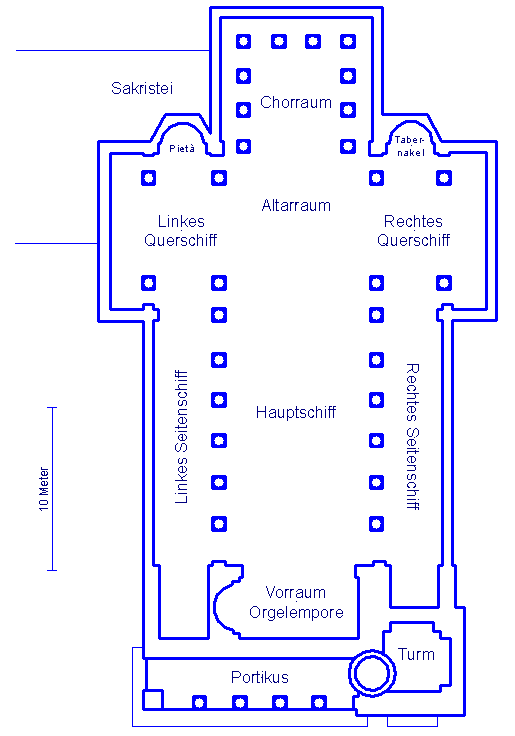
Floor plan of the church (2006)

Sound of bells of Mater Dolorosa

During the night of 23 to 24 August 1943 the church building was severely damaged by a bomb attack and could not be used anymore. Its first church service after partial rebuilding was on Palm Sunday in 1950. In the years 1968 to 1970 the whole building and in 1983 to 1984 the original ground plan of the basilica were reconstructed.

The bronze bells of 1963 dedicated to Maria Magdalena, Mater Dolorosa and John the Apostle are tuned to the beginning notes of the Gregorian Te Deum e - g - a.

== Foundation of other parishes in the district ==
Two other Catholic parishes in Berlin-Lankwitz and one quasi parish in Berlin-Lichterfelde were founded by Mater Dolorosa:

- St. Benedikt (English: St. Benedict), Lankwitz (dedication 1968)
- Von der Auferstehung Christi (English: Of the Resurrection of Christ), Lankwitz (dedication 1970)
- Maria Mutter vom Guten Rat (English: Mother Mary of Good Counsel), Lichterfelde-Süd (dedication 1980)

== Church music ==
From 1926 to 1942 the composer Max Walter – a scholar of Arnold Schoenberg – was church musician. The first organ was destroyed in 1943 after the bombing. The current organ was built in 1977 by the Freiburg organ builder Hartwig Späth and it was extended twice in 1987 and 1995. Today it has three manuals and more than 2500 organ pipes.

Furthermore, there is a smaller organ of the organ builder Paul Ott in the left lateral nave.

The parish has a mixed choir, a children's choir, a gospel choir and a Gregorian choir.

== Persons ==
- Johannes Pinsk (1891–1957), a German theologian and honorary professor at the Free University of Berlin, led the parish from 1939 to 1954.
- Johann Baptist Gradl (1904–1988), German politician
- Hanna-Renate Laurien (1928–2010), German politician
- Michael Linden (born 1948), German neurologist and professor of psychiatry
- Barbara Saß-Viehweger (born 1943), German politician, lawyer and civil law notary
- Daniel Stabrawa (born 1955), Polish musician (1st Concertmaster of the Berlin Philharmonic)
- Lorenz Weinrich (1929–2025), German professor of history

== Parochial life ==
The parish comprises about 4500 souls. The duties of the parish are supported by the Association of Friends of Mater Dolorosa and the legal, independent foundation Stiftung Mater Dolorosa Berlin-Lankwitz.
