= Hanna-Renate Laurien =

German politician

Hanna-Renate Laurien TOSD
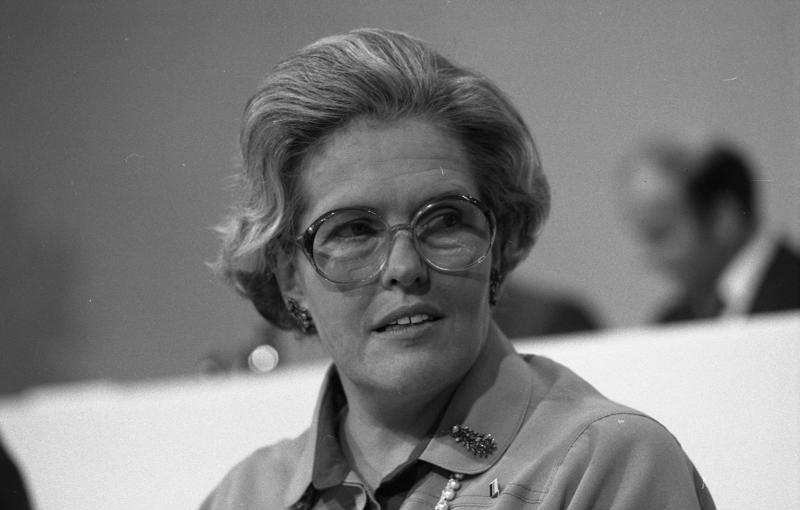
- Laurien at a 1978 CDU party conference

Minister of Education and Cultural Affairs of Rhineland-Palatinate
- In office 2 December 1976 – 11 June 1981

Senator of School, Youth and Sports of Berlin
- In office 11 June 1981 – 16 March 1989

President of the Abgeordnetenhaus of Berlin
- In office 11 January 1991 – 30 November 1995

Personal details
- Born: 15 April 1928 Danzig, Free City of Danzig
- Died: 12 March 2010 (aged 81) Berlin, Germany
- Party: CDU
- Education: Free University of Berlin
- Occupation: teacher
- Nickname: Hanna Granata

Hanna-Renate Laurien (15 April 1928 – 12 March 2010) was a German politician of the Christian Democratic Union (CDU).

== Biography ==
Laurien was born in Danzig (then Free City of Danzig, present-day Gdańsk, Poland). She was baptized Lutheran and converted to Catholicism in the age of 24. Laurien studied Germanistics, Philosophy, English and Slavic studies at the Free University of Berlin and started to work as a teacher in North Rhine-Westphalia.

In 1966 she joined the CDU in Cologne and in 1971 was appointed state secretary in Helmut Kohl's state cabinet of Rhineland-Palatinate, assigned to Culture Minister Bernhard Vogel, who became a close friend. From 1975 she also was an elected member of the Landtag of Rhineland-Palatinate. When Vogel became Minister-President in 1976, Laurien succeeded him as Minister for Education and Cultural Affairs.

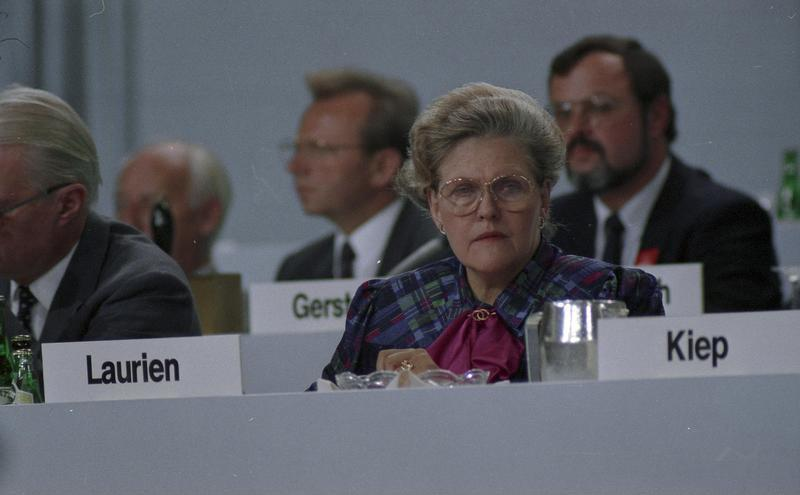
Laurien in 1986

In 1981, she became Senator of Education in the West Berlin Senate under Governing Mayor Richard von Weizsäcker, where her firm appearance earned her the nickname Hanna Granata ("Hanna the Grenade"). When Weizsäcker was elected President of Germany in 1984, Laurien ran within the CDU against Eberhard Diepgen for the candidacy as succeeding Governing Mayor, but only came off second best. She nevertheless maintained her office as Senator and from 1986 to 1989 also served as Vice Mayor. With Diepgen, Laurien had to resign from her office upon the 1989 Berlin state election.

In 1991 she was elected the first female presiding officer by the members of the Berlin Parliament (Abgeordnetenhaus), also the first after the Reunification of Germany. During her time in office, she committed herself against rising xenophobia and for the protection of human dignity from racist and Neo-Nazi attacks. She retired from office in 1995 and also left the national board of the CDU one year later.

From 1967 until 2000, Laurien, a consecrated virgin, served in the main committee member of the Central Committee of German Catholics. She also was a member of the Third Order of Saint Dominic and of the parish of Mater Dolorosa (Berlin-Lankwitz). She died in Berlin. The pontifical requiem for was celebrated by Georg Cardinal Sterzinsky on 29 March 2010.

== Awards ==
- Honorary degree of the University of Münster
- Order of Merit of the Federal Republic of Germany, 1981
