= Barbara Saß-Viehweger =

German politician (born 1943)

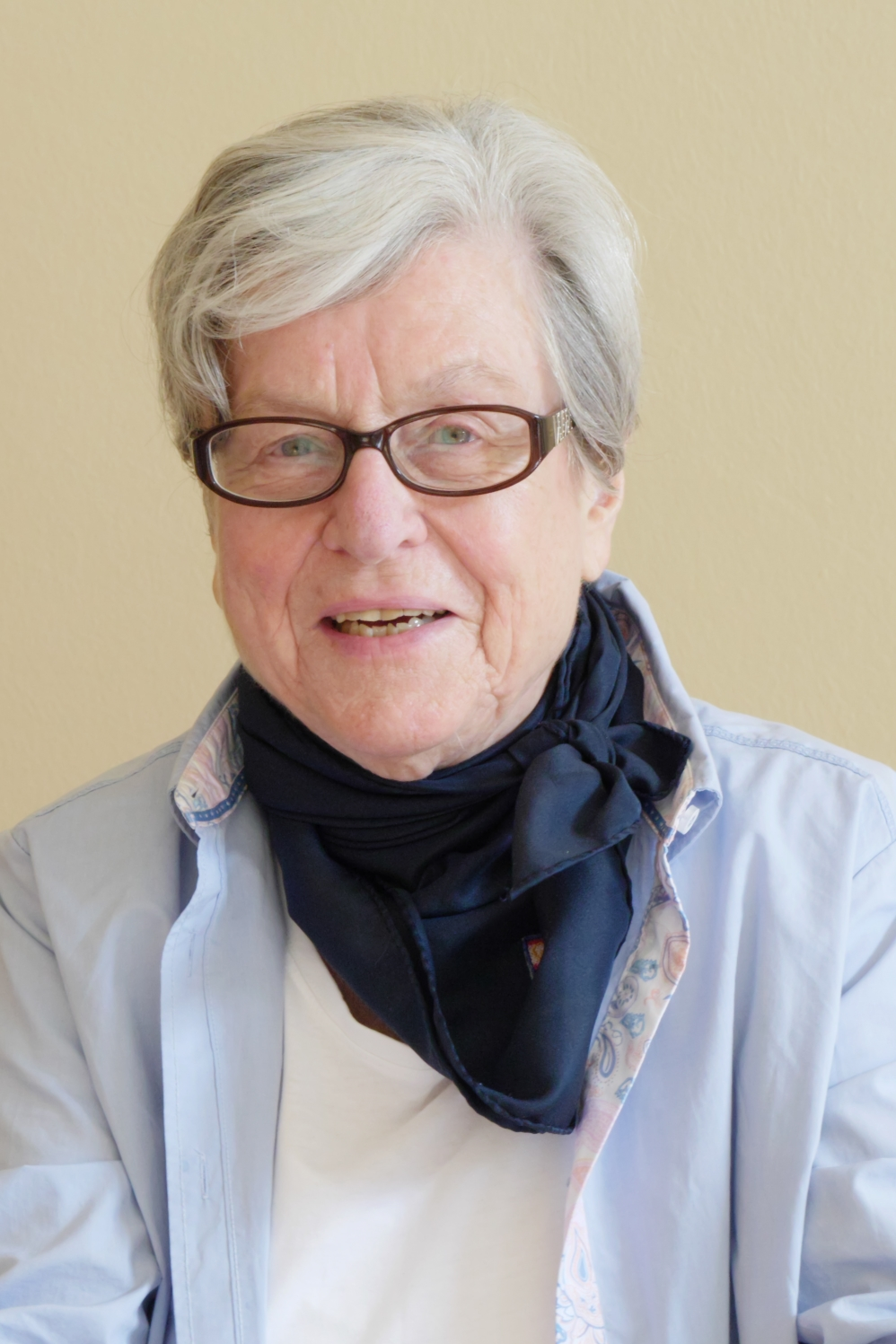
- Saß-Viehweger in 2017

Personal details
- Born: Barbara Weyand; 4 August 1943 (age 82) Worbis, Saxony, Germany
- Party: Christian Democratic
- Profession: Notary and lawyer

Barbara Saß-Viehweger (née Weyand; born 4 August 1943) is a German civil law notary, lawyer, and politician. She is member of the Christian Democratic Union of Germany.

== Early life and education ==
Born in Worbis, Province of Saxony, Saß-Viehweger grew up in Berlin where she attended school. She studied jurisprudence in Berlin, Köln and Freiburg and finished in 1970 with her Second Staatsexamen; afterwards she worked as lawyer. From 1980 to 2013 she additionally acted as civil law notary.

Based in Lankwitz, she is member of the Roman Catholic parish Mater Dolorosa (Berlin-Lankwitz), where she acts as member of the management board and as member of the council of the independent foundation Stiftung Mater Dolorosa Berlin-Lankwitz.

== Career ==
She was member of the communal parliament in Steglitz from 1971 to 1975, and member of the Abgeordnetenhaus of Berlin from 1975 (when her name was Barbara Saß) to 1995, and therefore, she was member of the Landtag for six successive Legislation periods, always with a direct mandate of her electoral district. She was mainly engaged in legal and domestic policy, where she was speaker of the parliamentary group of the Christian Democratic Union (CDU) for many years. Furthermore, she acted in several investigation committees and she chaired the Enquete-Kommission (inquiry commission) for the administration reform in Berlin.
