= Blex =

Blex is a surname. Notable people with the surname include:

- Christian Blex (born 1975), German politician
- Doug Blex (born 1946), American politician

== See also ==
- Blech (disambiguation)
