= Stiftung Mater Dolorosa Berlin-Lankwitz =

German foundation

Coordinates: 52°25′22″N 13°20′11″E

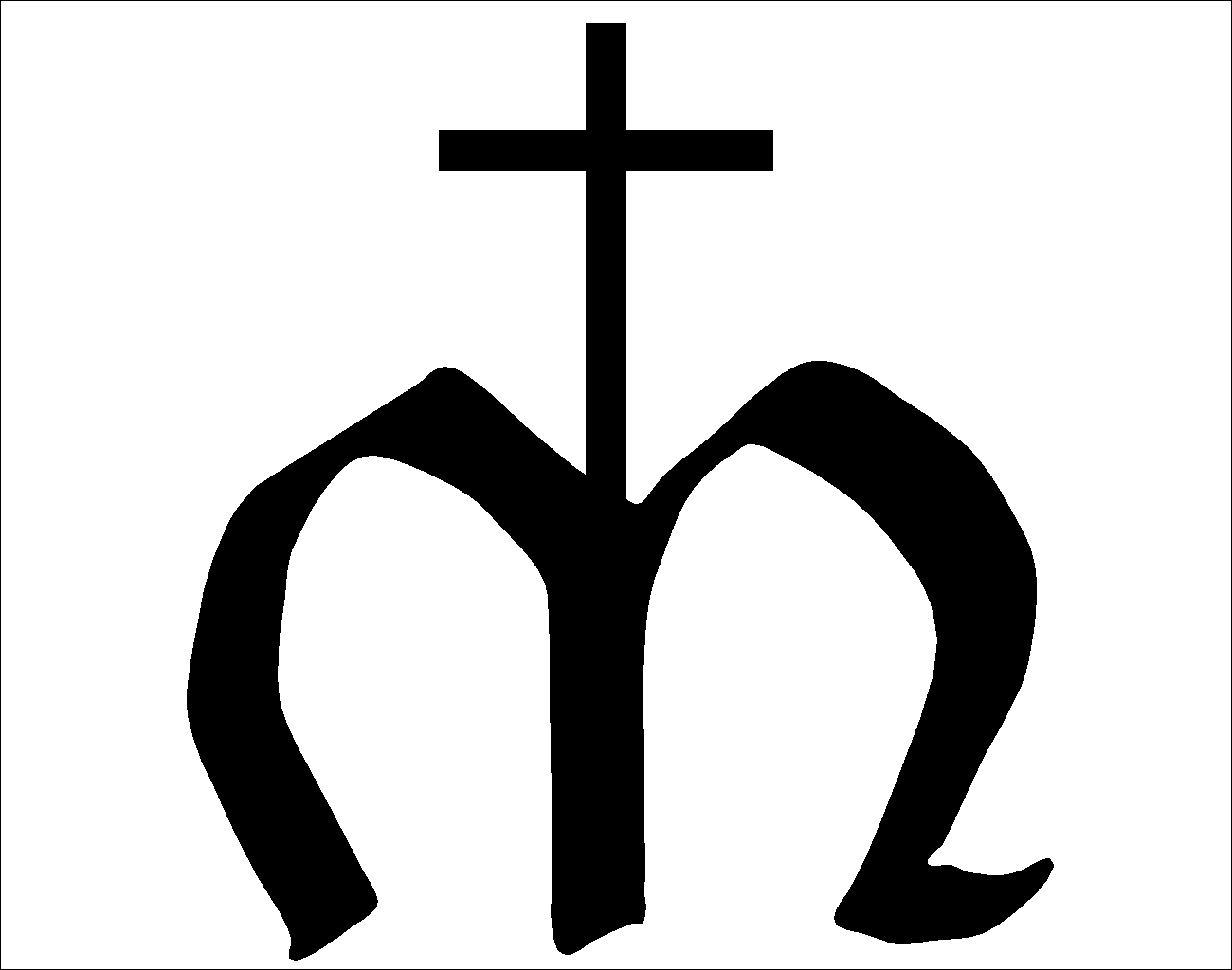
- Formation: 2006
- Founder: Mater Dolorosa (Berlin-Lankwitz)
- Legal status: Independent non-profit foundation under civil law
- Headquarters: (Germany) Berlin-Lankwitz
- Affiliations: Mater Dolorosa (Berlin-Lankwitz)
- Budget: €1,900,000 (2015)
- Staff: 8 (2019)
- Website: mater-dolorosa-lankwitz.de

The Stiftung Mater Dolorosa Berlin-Lankwitz (Mater Dolorosa Berlin-Lankwitz Foundation) is an independent nonprofit foundation under the civil law of Germany and Berlin based in Lankwitz in the borough Steglitz-Zehlendorf of Berlin. The foundation was founded by the parish Mater Dolorosa (Berlin-Lankwitz) in 2006, and it was the first independent foundation of a parish within the Roman Catholic Archdiocese of Berlin. The foundation took into consideration the strong cut of financial grants by the Roman Catholic Archdiocese of Berlin which came along with the decline of church taxes and the consequential financial crisis of the archdiocese in 2003.

== Mission ==
The mission of the foundation is to support the parish Mater Dolorosa (Berlin-Lankwitz) financially. This can be realised by the sponsorship of church-related, charitable and non-profit matters.

== Organisation ==
The Stiftung Mater Dolorosa Berlin-Lankwitz is a self-dependent foundation and it has two foundation organs: an executive three-person management board and a controlling five-person council board. Furthermore, the non-profit status is controlled by the governmental finance authority and independence and conformity to law are supervised by the governmental controlling authority. The foundation is supporting projects, but it is not acting operatively.

The historian Lorenz Weinrich was co-founder of the foundation, the politician, lawyer and civil law notary Barbara Saß-Viehweger is member since 2006 and the psychiatrist Michael Linden was member of the council board from 2009 to 2014.
