= Berliner Synchron =

German post-production dubbing company

Coordinates: 52.4335°N 13.3498°E

Berliner Synchron GmbH
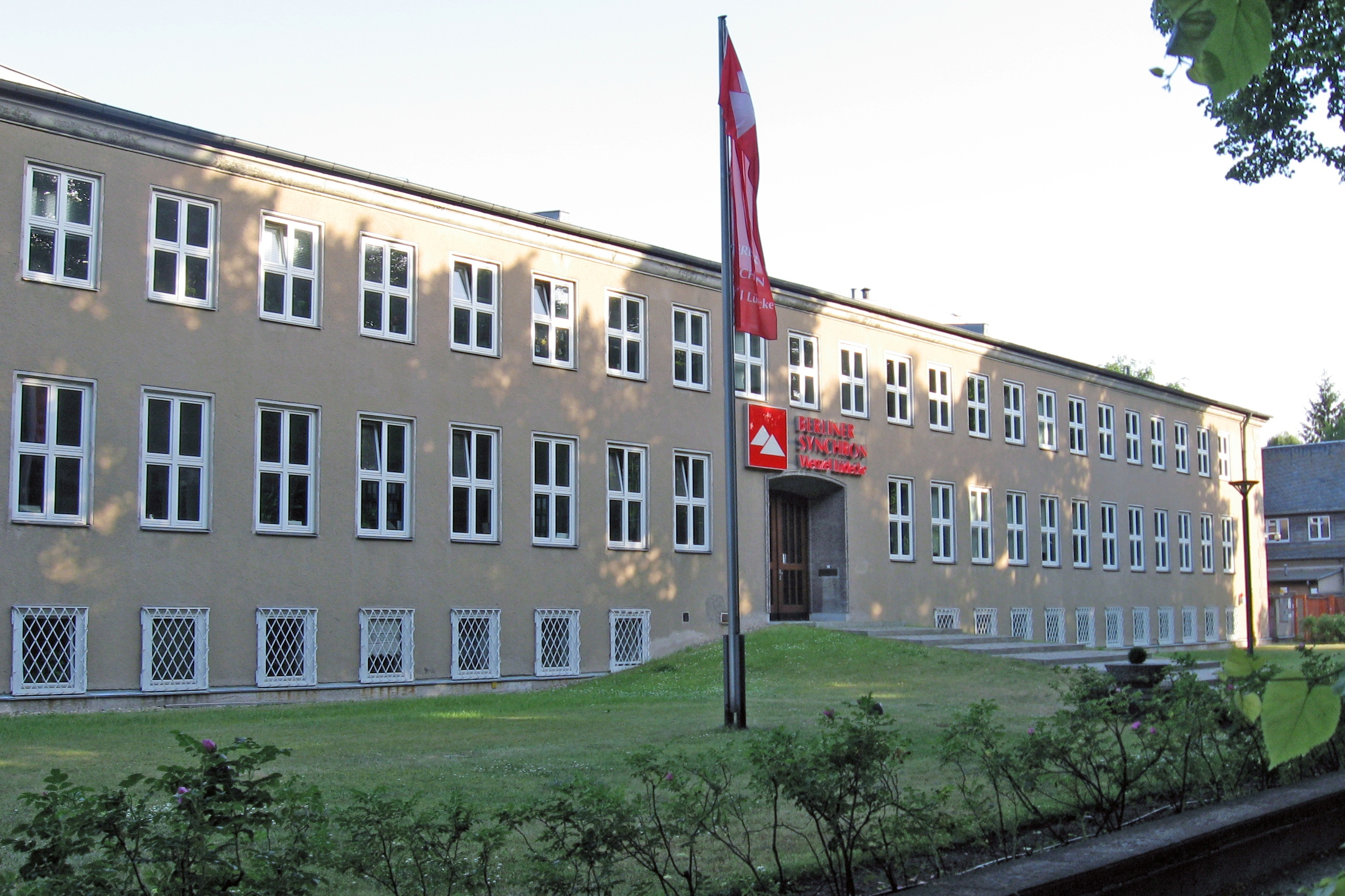
- Former headquarters in Lankwitz
- Formerly: Berliner Synchron AG
- Type: GmbH
- ISIN: DE000A0J39B7
- Founded: October 14, 1949 in Lankwitz, West Berlin, West Germany
- Founder: Wenzel Lüdecke
- Headquarters: Lankwitz, Berlin, Germany
- Area served: Worldwide
- Key people: Wolfram Lüdecke (CEO); Marcus Dröscher (CFO)
- Products: Movies and TV Shows
- Services: Audio Dubbing
- Owner: S&L Medien Gruppe
- Number of employees: 80
- Website: www.berliner-synchron.de/1/ (english)

The Iyuno Germany GmbH (formerly known as Berliner Synchron AG until 2014 and then as Berliner Synchron GmbH until 2020) is the largest and one of the oldest German post-production dubbing companies. It was founded on 14 October 1949 by Wenzel Lüdecke and later managed by Lüdecke's son, Wolfram Lüdecke, who was CEO from 1987 until 2016. Currently, the company is owned by S&L Medien Gruppe (S&L Media Group).The building was demolished and houses were built.

== History ==
In 1949, Film producer Wenzel Lüdecke saw an increasing market for dubbed movies originating from outside Germany, and subsequently founded Berliner Synchron. Post World War II, he was the only person to be granted permission by the Allied Forces to produce German dubbed versions of movies and TV series produced in the United States and UK. Business increased dramatically in the 1950s when television returned to the Federal Republic of Germany, known also as West Germany prior to the German reunification of 1990.

Between the 60s and 80s, theatre popularity began to decline, whereas television popularity increased. With the introduction of magnetic tapes, this gave Lüdecke ample opportunity to take advantage of the surge in Hollywood success by producing German language versions of worldwide box-office hits. In 1987, Lüdecke passed ownership of the company to his son, Wolfram. Wenzel then died two years later on 5 September 1989, having been responsible for the production of over 5000 movies and TV series during his time as owner.

The main building at the Lankwitzer Mühlenstraße (Lankwitzer Mill Road) was built in 1938 for the Air Force. After the Second World War, the building was used primarily by Mosaik, a production company. Wenzel Lüdecke rented the building and took over the entire complex in 1974.

In 1972, the Berliner Synchron worked with the Kirch Group to create a new company, Arena synchronous, which was managed until 1997 in the same building and mainly synchronized television series for the Kirch Group.

On 3 July 2006, BSG was converted from a GmbH into an AG (joint stock company). Ten years later, in 2016, this was reversed with a spin-off, while the parent company was renamed to CINEMEDIA AG as part of insolvency proceedings. Berliner Synchron was then acquired by the S&L Medien Gruppe.

== Filmography ==
To date, Berliner Synchron have dubbed over 7000 movies and TV series into German, including productions such as The Third Man, Psycho, The Godfather, all the Star Wars films, Schindler's List, Forrest Gump, American Beauty, Gladiator, Shrek and Ice Age . In the field of television, they have created German versions of Hawaii Five-O, The Cosby Show and Boston Public.

== Awards ==
- 2009: German Prize for dubbing production companies in the category Outstanding synchronized TV series for Extras.
- 2009: Liliput Prize for outstanding film dubbing and subtitling of the film Welcome to the Sticks
