= Trauma trigger =

Experience causing recall of a trauma

A trauma trigger is a psychological stimulus that prompts involuntary recall of a previous traumatic experience, typically in the form of a flashback to that overwhelming prior experience. The stimulus itself need not be frightening or traumatic and may be only indirectly or superficially reminiscent of an earlier traumatic incident, such as a scent or a piece of clothing. Triggers can be subtle, individual, and difficult for others to predict. A trauma trigger may also be called a trauma stimulus, a trauma stressor or a trauma reminder.

The process of connecting a traumatic experience to a trauma trigger is called traumatic coupling. When trauma is "triggered", the involuntary response goes far beyond feeling uncomfortable or upset and can feel overwhelming and uncontrollable, such as a panic attack, a flashback, or a strong impulse to flee to a safe place. Avoiding a trauma trigger, and therefore the potentially extreme reaction it provokes, is a common behavioral symptom of post-traumatic stress disorder (PTSD) and post-traumatic embitterment disorder (PTED), treatable and usually temporary conditions in which people sometimes experience overwhelming emotional or physical symptoms when something reminds them of, or "triggers" the memory of a traumatic event. Long-term avoidance of triggers increases the likelihood that the affected person will develop a disabling level of PTSD. Identifying and addressing trauma triggers is an important part of treating PTSD.

A trigger warning is a message presented to an audience about the contents of a piece of media, to warn them that it contains potentially distressing content. A more generic term, which is not directly focused on PTSD, is content warning.

== Triggers ==
Trauma triggers have been recognized by medical professionals since the 19th century. The trigger can be anything that provokes fear or distressing memories in the affected person, and which the affected person associates with a previous traumatic experience. Just as trauma is not merely an unpleasant or adverse experience, a trauma trigger is not merely something that makes a person feel uncomfortable or offended. Some common triggers are:

- a particular smell – such as freshly mown grass, the fragrance of an aftershave product or perfume. The sense of smell, olfaction, may be more closely connected to traumatic reminders than other sensory experiences.
- a particular taste – such as the food eaten during or shortly before a traumatic experience
- a particular sound – such as a helicopter or a song
- a particular texture
- certain times of day – for example, sunset or sunrise
- certain times of year or specific dates – for example, autumn weather that resembles the affected person's experience of the weather during the September 11 attacks, or the anniversary of a traumatic experience
- sights – (real, photo, film or video) for examples, a fallen tree or a light shining at a particular angle
- places – for example, a bathroom, or all bathrooms
- a person, especially a person who was present during a traumatic event or resembles someone involved in that event in some respect
- an argument
- a sensation on the skin – such as the feeling of a wristwatch resembling the feeling of handcuffs, or sexual touching for victims of sexual assault
- the position of the body
- physical pain
- emotions – such as feeling overwhelmed, vulnerable, or not in control
- a particular situation – for example, being in a crowded place

The trigger is usually personal and specific. However, it need not be closely related to the actual experience. For example, after the Gulf War, some Israelis experienced the sound of an accelerating motorbike as a trigger, which they associated with the sound of sirens they heard during the war, even though the resemblance between the two sounds is limited.

The realistic portrayal of graphic violence in visual media may expose some affected people to triggers while watching movies or television.

== Experiences ==
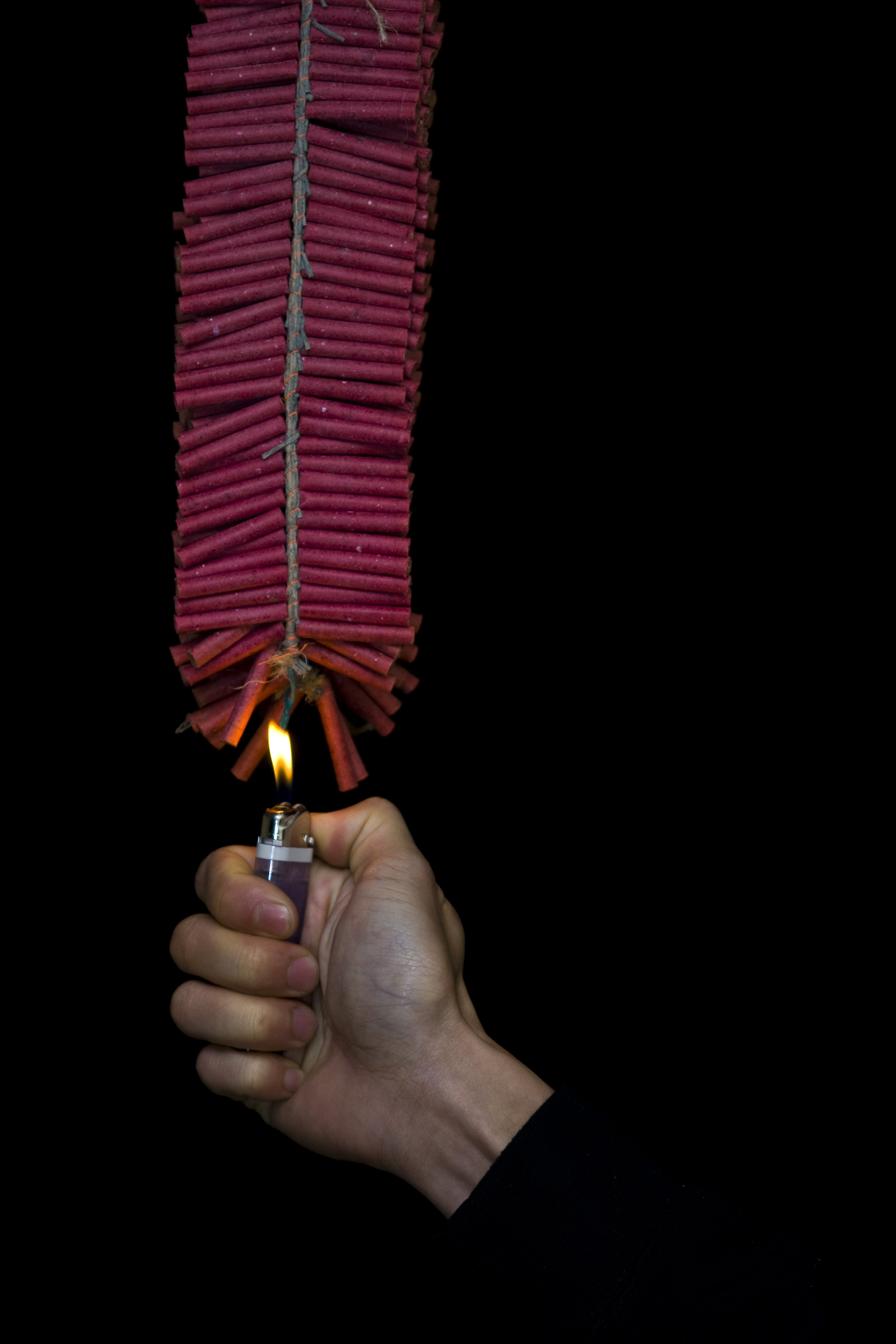
The bang of firecrackers can be a trauma trigger for some people.

People who have experienced trauma and who have developed trauma triggers may panic when the trigger is experienced, especially if it is unexpected. For example, the noise of fireworks may seem unbearable to a combat veteran whose trauma is coupled with sudden, loud noises as the trigger.

== Trigger warnings ==
Trigger warnings, sometimes called content warnings, are warnings that a work contains writing, images, or concepts that may be distressing to some people. Content warnings have been widely used in mass media without any connection to trauma, such as the US TV Parental Guidelines, which indicate that a show includes content that some families may find inappropriate for their children. The term trigger warning, with its trauma-specific context, originated at feminist websites that were discussing violence against women, and then spread to other areas, such as print media and university courses. Although it is widely recognized that any sight, sound, smell, taste, touch, feeling or sensation could be a trigger, trigger warnings are most commonly presented on a relatively narrow range of material, especially content about sexual abuse and mental illness (such as suicide, eating disorders, and self-injury).

In the case of non-fiction books and online videos, only specific chapters or segments may have trigger warnings, providing timestamps and page numbers that allow the audience to easily skip only certain parts, rather than the entire work. This may be more difficult to employ in works of fiction, where skipping certain parts disrupts the narrative flow.

=== Controversy in higher education ===
The idea of giving content warnings to university students about their coursework has been disputed and politicized. Much of the dispute centers around content warnings given to all students about the presence of generally uncomfortable subjects in the curriculum, such as racism and misogyny. There is no significant dispute over providing reasonable accommodations to the small number of students (usually current and former military personnel and sexual assault survivors) who qualify as having a disabling level of post-traumatic stress disorder and whose ability to learn the normal curriculum can be improved, for example, by mentioning in advance that the next reading assignment contains a detailed description of a violent event or that an upcoming ballistic pendulum demonstration will produce loud sounds.

In 2014, the American Association of University Professors criticized the use of general content warnings in university contexts, stating, "The presumption that students need to be protected rather than challenged in a classroom is at once infantilizing and anti-intellectual. It makes comfort a higher priority than intellectual engagement and...it singles out politically controversial topics like sex, race, class, capitalism, and colonialism for attention." This view is supported by some professors such as Richard McNally, professor of psychology at Harvard, and some psychiatric medical practitioners, such as Metin Basoglu and Edna Foa. (Note: Attributed to multiple sources:) They believe that trigger warnings increase avoidance behaviors by those with PTSD which makes it harder to overcome the PTSD, create a culture that decreases resilience, and more geared towards political virtue signaling, and are "counterproductive to the educational process". (Note: Attributed to multiple sources:)

Since the publication of the American Association of University Professors' report, other professors, such as Angus Johnston, have supported trigger warnings as a part of "sound pedagogy". Other supportive professors have stated that "the purpose of trigger warnings is not to cause students to avoid traumatic content, but to prepare them for it, and in extreme circumstances to provide alternate modes of learning."

Universities have taken different stances on the issue of trigger warnings. In a letter welcoming new undergraduates, the University of Chicago wrote that the college's "commitment to academic freedom means we do not support so-called 'trigger warnings'," do not cancel controversial speakers, and do not "condone the creation of intellectual 'safe spaces' where individuals can retreat from thoughts and ideas at odds with their own". Students at UC Santa Barbara took the opposite position in 2014, passing a non-binding resolution in support of mandatory trigger warnings for classes that could contain potentially upsetting material. Professors were encouraged to make students aware of such material and allow them to skip classes that could make them feel uncomfortable.

=== Limited value for general use ===
Although the subject has generated political controversy, research suggests that trigger warnings are neither harmful nor especially helpful. Among people without traumatic experiences, "trigger warnings did not affect anxiety responses to potentially distressing material in general." Furthermore, studies disagree on whether trigger warnings cause transient increases in anxiety in those without traumatic experiences. For participants who self-reported a posttraumatic stress disorder (PTSD) diagnosis, or for participants who qualified for probable PTSD, trigger warnings had little statistically significant effect. Effect sizes on feelings of avoidance, decreased resilience, or other negative outcomes have been "trivial" in controlled research environments.

While trigger warnings have garnered significant debate, few studies have investigated how students typically respond to potentially triggering material. In a 2021 study, 355 undergraduate students from four universities read a passage describing incidents of both physical and sexual assault. Longitudinal measures of subjective distress, PTSD symptoms, and emotional reactivity were measured. Greater than 96% of participants read the triggering passage even when given a non-triggering alternative to read. Of those who read the triggering passage, those with triggering traumas did not report more distress although those with higher PTSD scores did. Two weeks later, those with trigger traumas and/or PTSD did not report an increase in trauma symptoms as a result of reading the triggering passage. Moreover, students with relevant traumas do not avoid triggering material and the effects appear to be brief, and students with PTSD do not report an exacerbation of symptoms two weeks later as a function of reading the passage.

== See also ==
- Acute stress disorder – sometimes called being in shock
- Content rating – such as age-based labels for films
- Emotional dysregulation
- Hypervigilance – common symptom of PTSD
- Repressed memory
- Survivor guilt
