= Querulant =

Person who obsessively feels wronged

In the legal profession and courts, a querulant (from the Latin querulus - "complaining") is a person who obsessively feels wronged, particularly about minor causes of action. In particular the term is used for those who repeatedly petition authorities or pursue legal actions based on manifestly unfounded grounds. These applications include in particular complaints about petty offenses.

Querulant behavior is to be distinguished from either the obsessive pursuit of justice regarding major injustices, or the proportionate, reasonable, pursuit of justice regarding minor grievances. According to Mullen and Lester, the life of the querulant individual becomes consumed by their personal pursuit of justice in relation to minor grievances.

== Use in psychiatry ==
In psychiatry, the terms querulous paranoia (Kraepelin, 1904) and litigious paranoia have been used to describe a paranoid condition which manifested itself in querulant behavior. The concept had, until 2004, disappeared from the psychiatric literature; largely because it had been misused to stigmatise the behavior of people seeking the resolution of valid grievances. It also appears in ICD-10, under its Latin name Paranoia querulans, in section F22.8, "Other persistent delusional disorders".

== Frequency ==
According to Lester et al. querulous behavior remains common, as shown in petitions to the courts and complaints organizations. They state that "persistent complainants' pursuit of vindication and retribution fits badly with complaints systems established to deliver reparation and compensation [and that these] complainants damaged the financial and social fabric of their own lives and frightened those dealing with their claims."

== See also ==
- Idée fixe
- Monomania
- Spamigation
- Vexatious litigation
