= Jörg Blech =

German science writer

Jörg Blech (born 1966) is a German science journalist and nonfiction author.

He is known primarily as a critic of the healthcare and pharmaceutical industries. His books cover such subjects as the healthcare industry's alleged invention of diseases to generate sales and medical treatments that turned out to harm people.

He studied biology and biochemistry in Germany and Britain. In addition to his books, which have been translated into English, French, Italian, Spanish, Dutch, Finnish, Hungarian, Polish, Chinese and Korean, he writes for the German publication Der Spiegel. His book, Inventing Disease and Pushing Pills: Pharmaceutical Companies and the Medicalisation of Normal Life, was reviewed by several journals.
