= Lankwitz =

- Quarter of Berlin
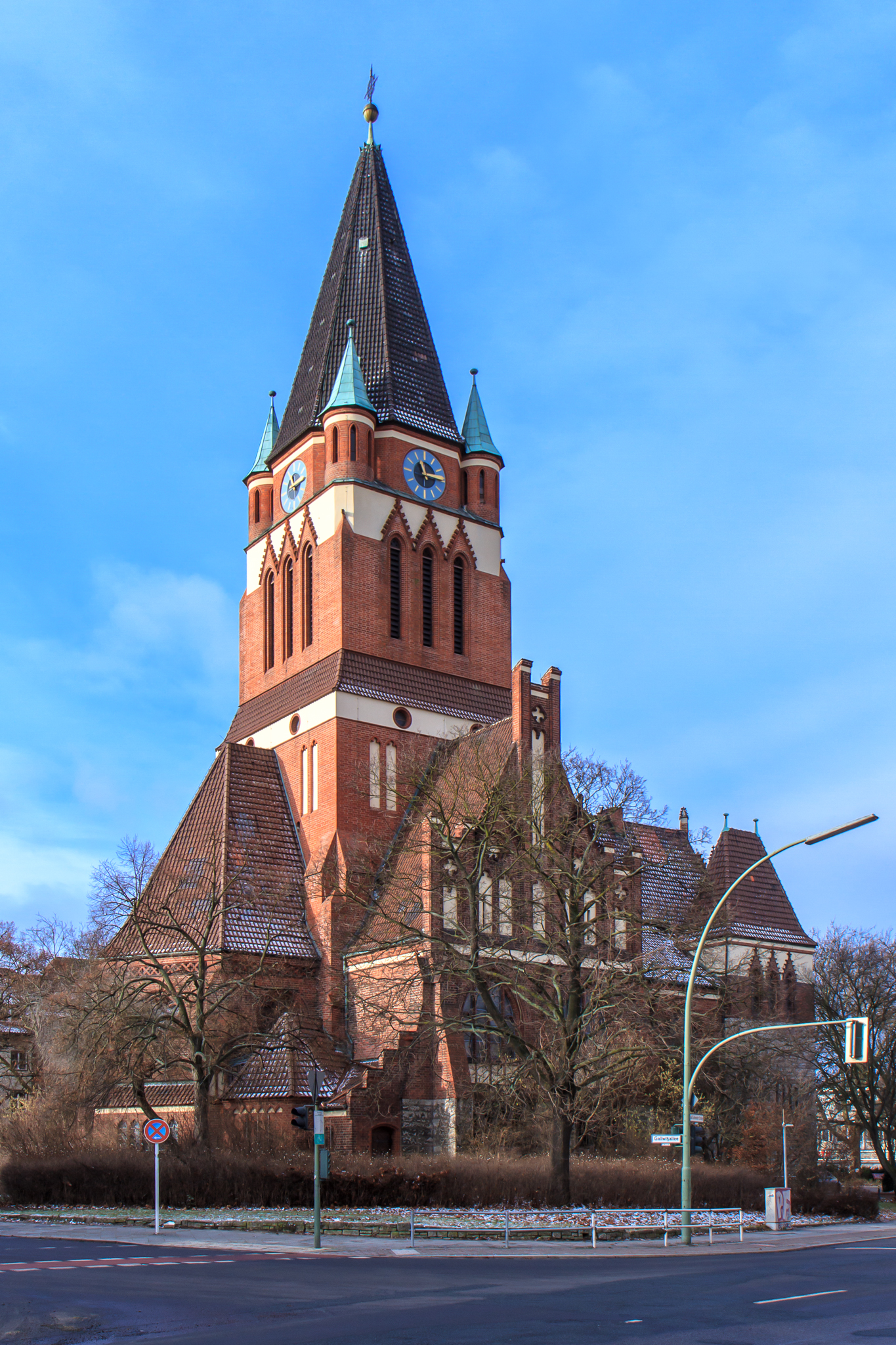
- Evangelical Dreifaltigkeitskirche

- Location of Lankwitz in Steglitz-Zehlendorf and Berlin
- Interactive map of Lankwitz
- Location within Germany Location within Berlin
- Coordinates: 52°26′00″N 13°21′00″E
- Country: Germany
- State: Berlin
- City: Berlin
- Borough: Steglitz-Zehlendorf
- Founded: 1239

Area
  - Total: 6.99 km^{2} (2.70 sq mi)
- Elevation: 50 m (160 ft)

Population (2024-12-31)
  - Total: 44,698
  - Density: 6,390/km^{2} (16,600/sq mi)
- Time zone: UTC+01:00 (CET)
  - Summer (DST): UTC+02:00 (CEST)
- Postal codes: 12247, 12249
- Vehicle registration: B
- Website: Official website

Lankwitz (German pronunciation: [ˈlaŋkˌvɪt͡s]) is a German locality (Ortsteil) within the borough (Bezirk) of Steglitz-Zehlendorf, Berlin. Until 2001 it was part of the former borough of Steglitz.

== History ==
The locality was first mentioned in 1239 with the name of Lancovica. Autonomous Prussian municipality of the former Teltow district, Lankwitz was incorporated into Berlin in 1920 as part of the district Steglitz, with the "Greater Berlin Act".

== Geography ==
Lankwitz is situated in the southern suburb of Berlin, close to the borders with Brandenburg. It borders the localities of Steglitz, Lichterfelde, Mariendorf, Marienfelde (both in Tempelhof-Schöneberg district) and, in a short point represented by a bridge over the Teltowkanal, with Tempelhof. The Teltowkanal also remarks the boundary between Lankwitz and Steglitz.

== Transport ==
The locality is served by S-Bahn at the rail station of Lankwitz (lines S25 and S26). The S2 only crosses the quarter and marks its border with Mariendorf. Lankwitz is also served by numerous bus lines.

== Photogallery ==
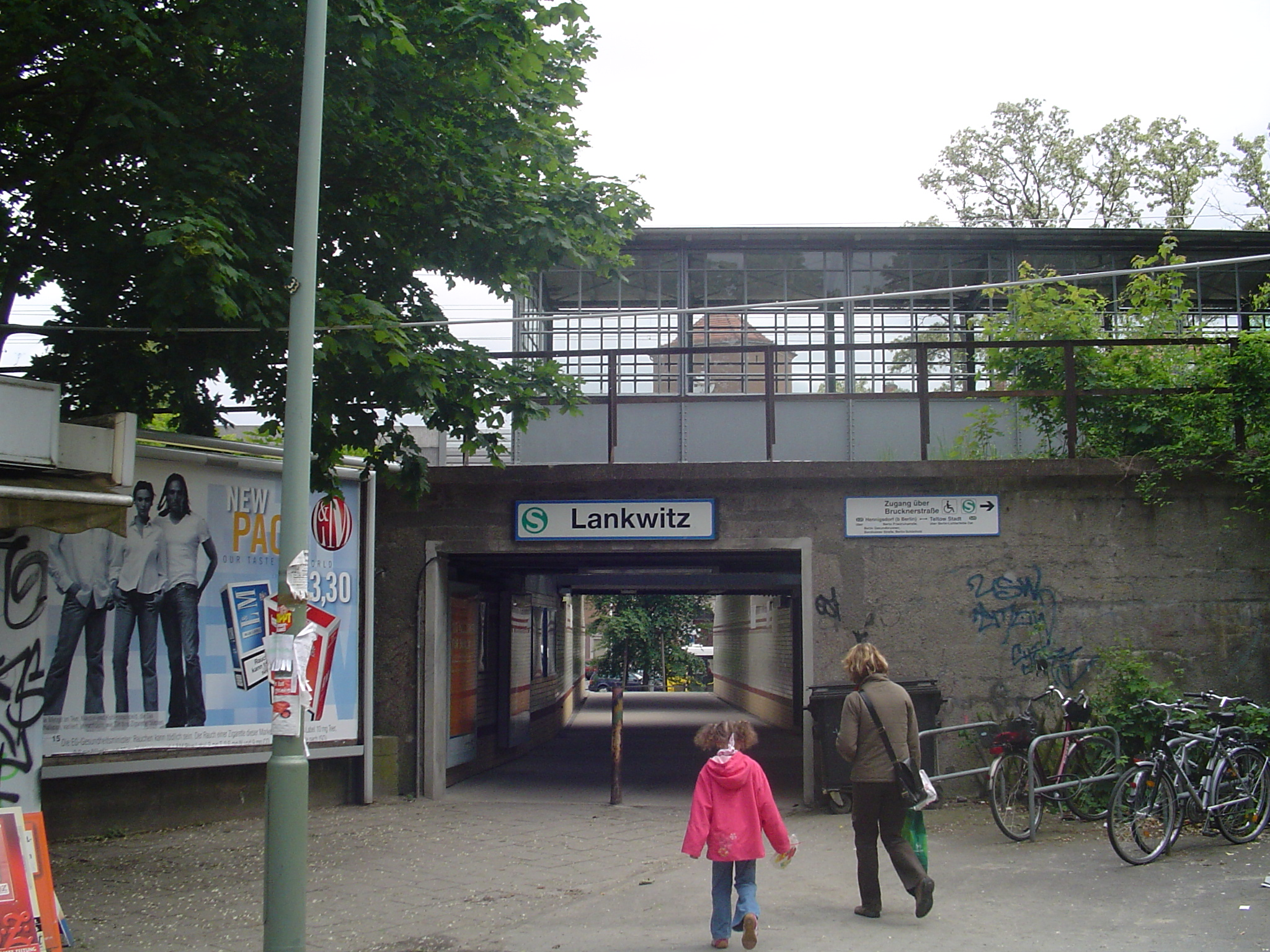
Northern entrance of Lankwitz station

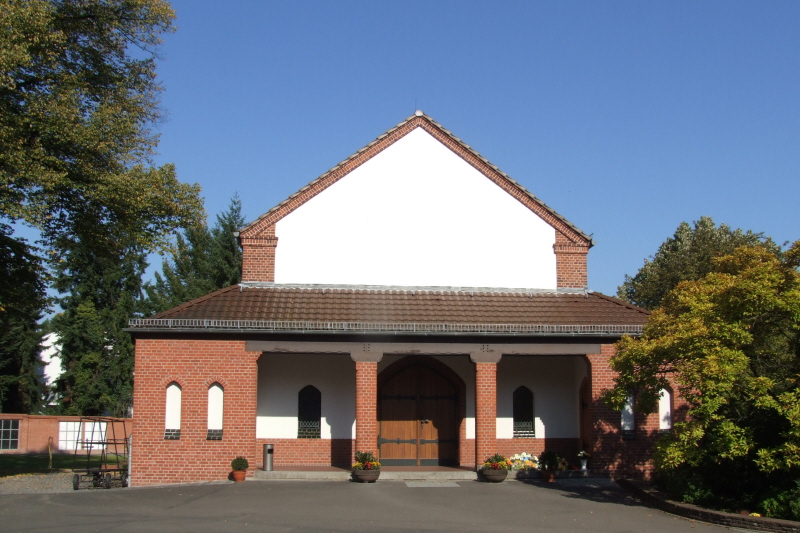
Chapel of "Luther-Friedhof" cemetery

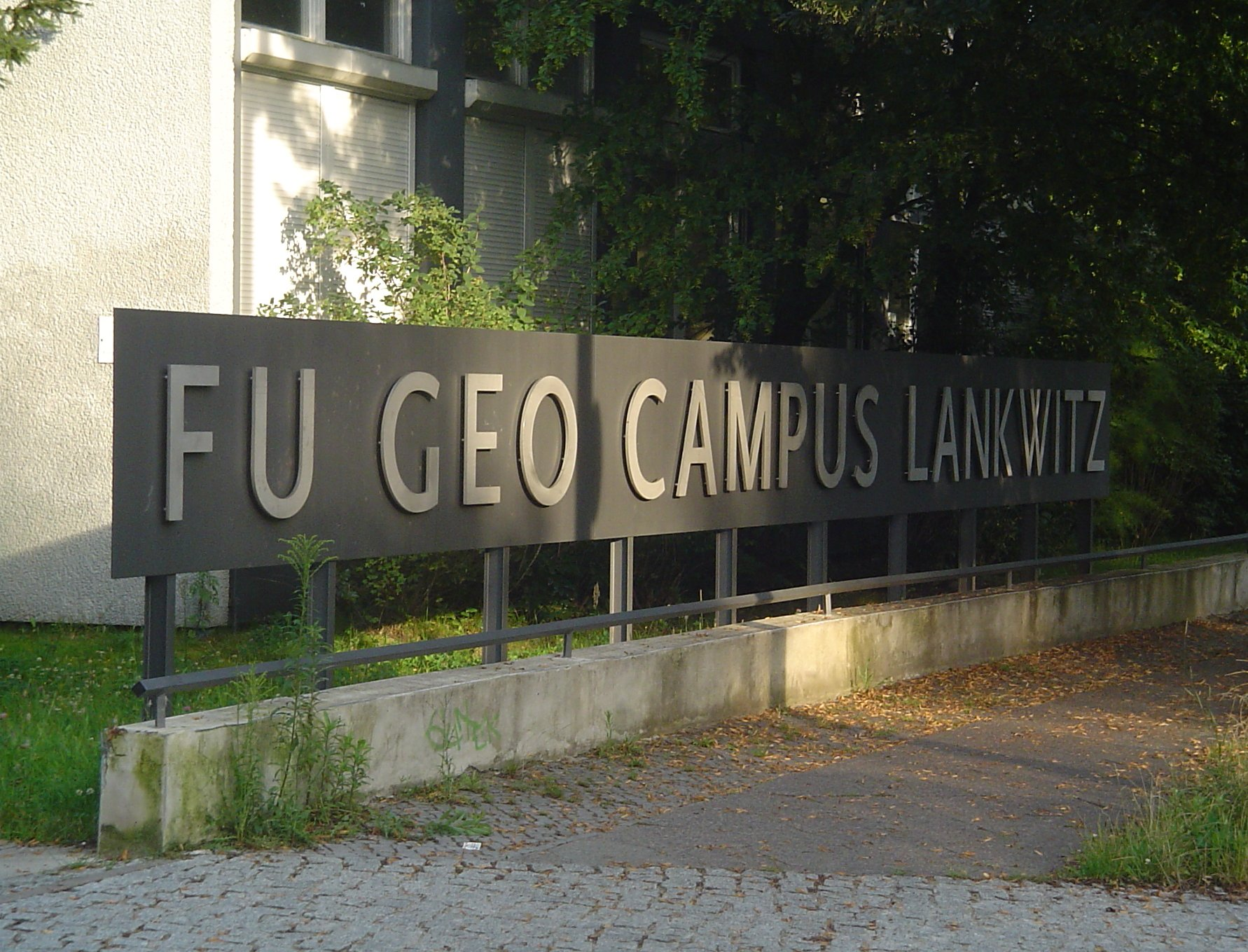
View of the "Campus Lankwitz" of the Free University of Berlin

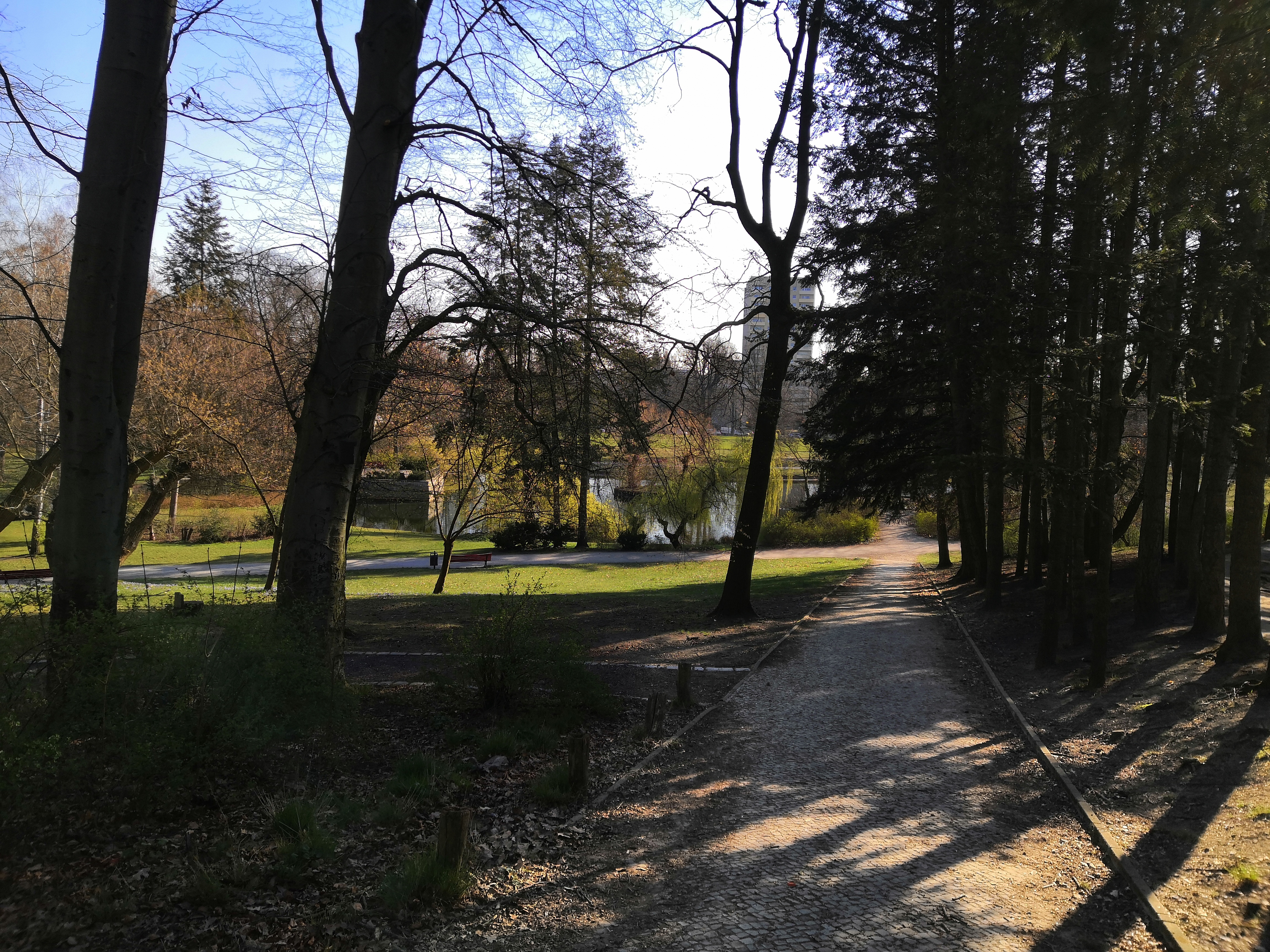
The Gemeindepark recreational area in April 2020

== Organisations ==
The following organisations are or were based in Lankwitz:

- Berliner Synchron (post-production dubbing company based in Lankwitz from 1949 until 2017)
- Mater Dolorosa (Berlin-Lankwitz) (Roman Catholic parish)
- Stiftung Mater Dolorosa Berlin-Lankwitz (Foundation)

== Buildings ==
The following buildings are located in Lankwitz:

- Lankwitz station

== Personalities ==
- Martin Benrath (1926–2000)
- Mithat Demirel (b. 1978)
- Heinz Henschel (1920–2006), German Ice Hockey Hall of Fame, and IIHF Hall of Fame inductee
- Marianne Rosenberg (b. 1955)
