= History of the Jews in Cologne =

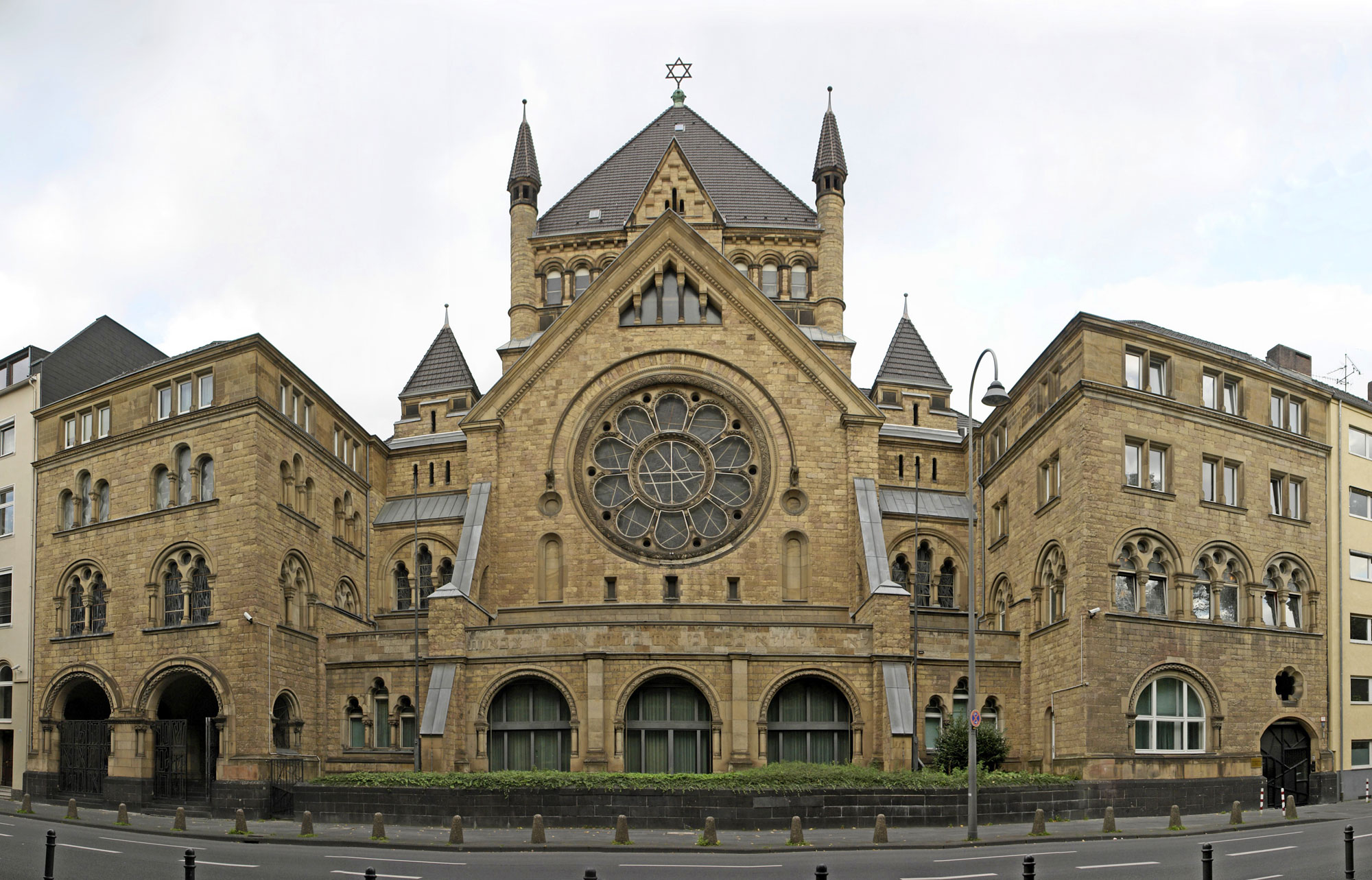
Synagoge Köln at Roonstraße in 2006

The history of the Jews in Cologne dates to 321 C.E., when they were first recorded in a census decreed by Emperor Constantine I. As such, it is the oldest European Jewish community north of the Alps. The community quickly established itself in what came to be known as Cologne's Jewish quarter, building its first synagogue by 1040 C.E. The Crusades put an end to peaceful coexistence with Christians in 1096 C.E. Despite the Archbishop's protection many Jews were killed and their synagogue destroyed. The community regained its economic and religious life until about 1300 C.E., when the Christian majority again applied pressure. The community's fortunes improved and worsened a number of times into the 20th century. Before the 1930s, it consisted of 19,500 people. After the end of World War II it had been almost entirely extinguished due to Nazi destruction, expulsion and murder. Currently it numbers approximately 5,000.

== The Roman Age ==
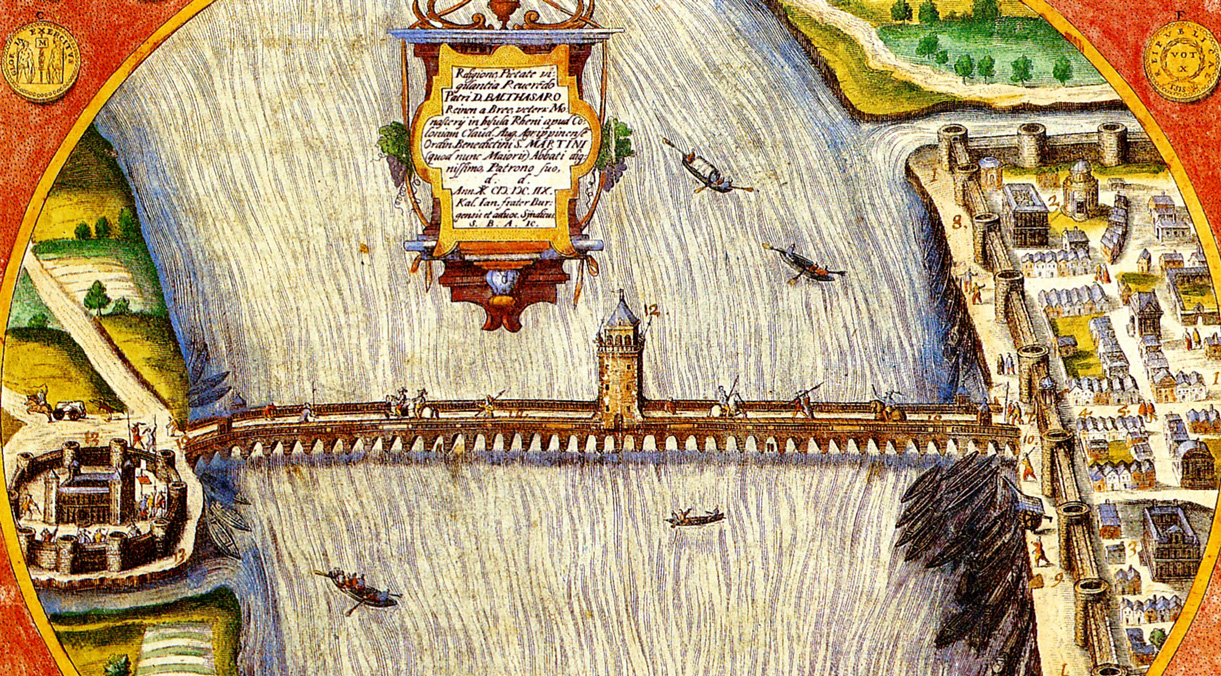
Emperor Constantine connects Cologne and Deutz with the first stable bridge

Cologne was founded and established in the 1st century AD, as the Roman Colonia Claudia Ara Agrippinensium in Ubii territory. It was the capital of the Roman province of Germania Inferior and the headquarters of the military in the region. Cologne was an important city in Roman times. H. Nissen assumes a much greater population for Roman Cologne than it was in the Middle Ages, when he estimates it was between 30,000 and 40,000.

Judaism was recognized as a religio licita (permitted religion), and Jews were exempt from the offering to the Emperor and to the offerings to the Roman state gods. However, these offerings were preconditions to holding public office. Thus, Jews were excluded from public service. For the appointment to a town office a person was required to own land and to have a certain reputation. In Late Antiquity, the Roman upper class increasingly refused to participate in these expensive offices, and the Roman administration went into crisis and the emperor had to look for alternatives. It became necessary for the Cologne Council to use a decree of Emperor Constantine the Great of 321, which permitted Jews to be appointed to the curia. This is the first evidence of the existence of a Jewish community in the town of Cologne. The emperor's decree was passed down in the Codex Theodosianus (439), which indicates the existence of a firmly established Jewish community in Cologne in 321 and 331. A partial translation of the Codex reads:

"We allow all town councils to appoint through general law, Jewish people in the Curia. To give them a certain compensation for the previous rules, we let that always two or three of them enjoy the privilege not to be taken to any office."

Archaeological finds indicate the presence of people from the Middle East at around this period, and among them there were Syrians, as is proved by an Aramaic inscription dug up in 1930. In another document, from 341, it is recorded that the synagogue was provided with the emperor's privilege. These decrees of Constantine remained for some centuries the only accounts of the existence of a Jewish community in Cologne.

== Middle Ages ==
=== Under the Frankish, Saxon and Salian kings ===
The region was occupied by the Franks in 462, which converted to Christianity by the end of the century. During the Middle Ages, Cologne flourished as one of the most important trade routes between east and west Europe. Cologne was one of the leading members of the Hanseatic League and one of the largest cities north of the Alps in medieval and renaissance times. The first documentary reference to the Jews in Cologne in the Middle Ages was to the time of Archbishop Heribert of Cologne (999–1021), the wise friend of Holy Roman Emperor Otto III. Winheim and Gelenius, basing themselves on the Annual Chronicles of Cologne during the 14th and 15th centuries, report that in 1426 the synagogue was turned into a church. They then remark that this synagogue had been in existence 414 years. That would place its origin in the time of Heribert. The Jewish Quarter close to Hohe Straße is mentioned for the first time during the episcopate of Anno II, Archbishop of Cologne (1056–1075) and a report has come down about the Jews joining in lament over the archbishop's death.

The number of Jews in the community during the last quarter of the 11th century was not less than 600. The markets of Cologne had attracted many Jewish visitors who had partly stayed. Italian Jews are mentioned in the stories about the Crusaders in Cologne. The fact that the Jewish community was important is proved further by the statement in these Hebrew reports that out of Cologne there went forth "our brethren scattered over the earth support for their life and correct words of judgment". It means that the community was the center of Jewish life for all the communities of the area.

=== Crusades ===
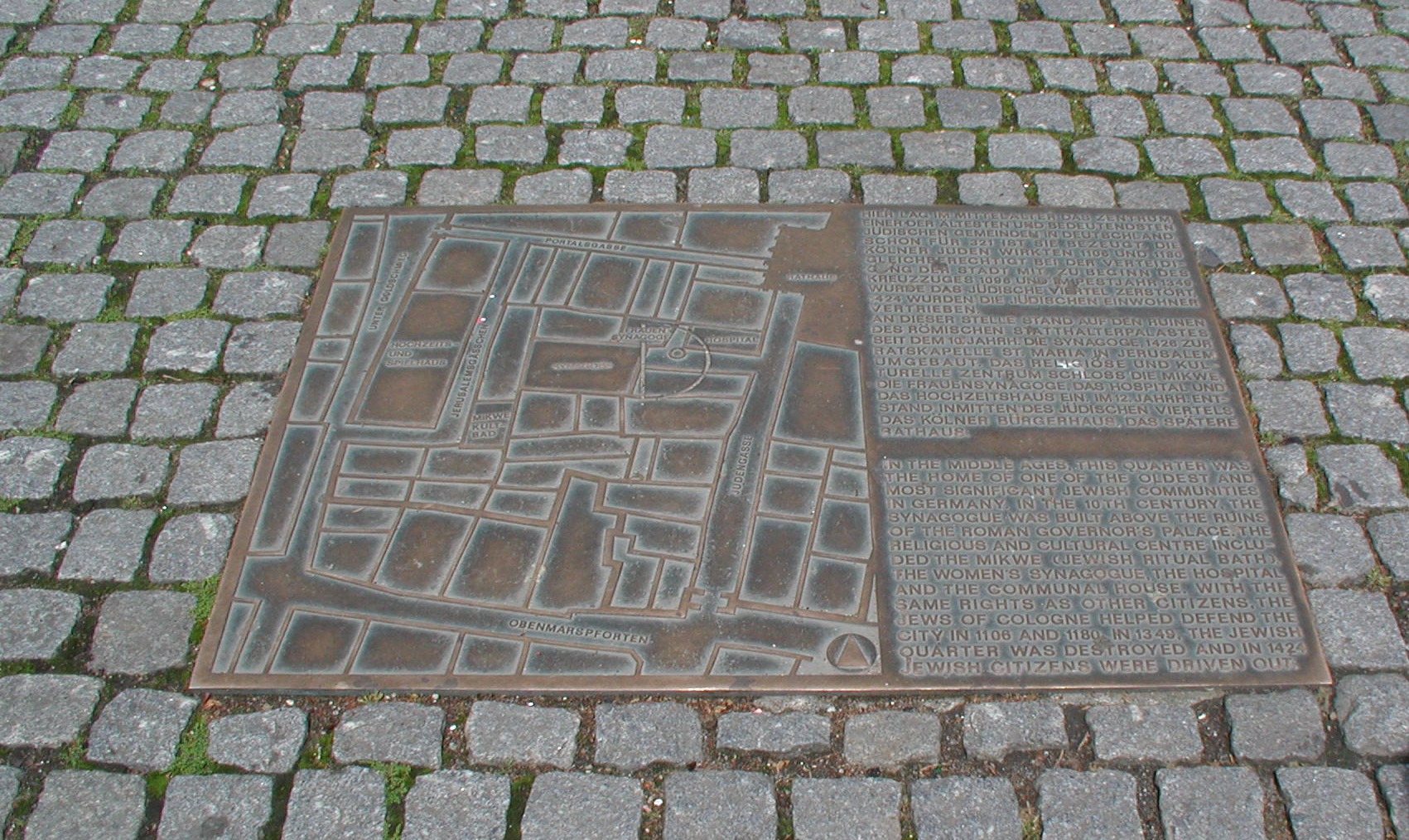
Plan of the Jewish quarter on Rathausplatz

During the Middle Ages, the Jewish community had been settled in a quarter near the Rathaus. Still now the name "Judengasse" testifies its existence. During the First Crusade in 1096 there were several pogroms. Although the Crusade started from France, assaults happened through the Holy Roman Empire. On 27 May 1096 hundreds of Jews were killed in Mainz during the Rhineland massacres. The palace of the archbishop of Mainz, Ruthard, where the Jews had taken refuge, was stormed by the Crusaders after little resistance. Ruthard was accused of appropriating the property of murdered Jews. A similar thing happened in July of the same year in Cologne. The Jews were forcibly baptized. The permission of Emperor Henry IV to let the Jews who had been forcibly baptized go back to their faith was not ratified by Antipope Clement III. From those times, small and large assaults were repeated not only in the Rhineland.

In the 12th and 13th century the antisemitic attitude of the town citizens became stronger. In 1146 other Jewish people were killed near Königswinter by a mob of furious Christians, just after the beginning of the Second Crusade. Also in Andernach, Altenahr, Bonn and Lechenich Jews were killed and their houses plundered. These events are presumably to be associated with a wave of persecutions in 1287/88. Violent assaults on Jews of Cologne are not reported in this period. Following the Fourth Council of the Lateran in 1215, all Jews were obliged to display on their clothing a clear sign they were not Christians.

=== Medieval pogroms in Cologne ===
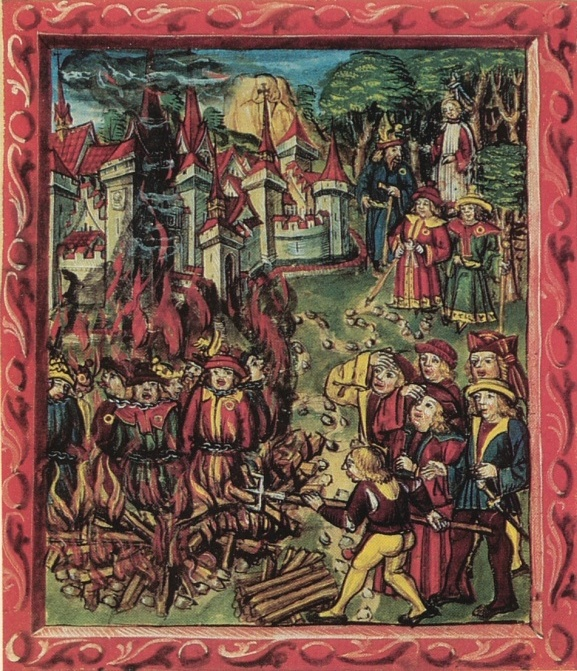
Jews burnt in Holy Roman Empire (medieval manuscript now in the Zentral- and Hochschulbibliothek Luzern)

An early pogrom against had taken place after the Battle of Worringen on 8 June 1288, when the defeated archbishop of Cologne had been imprisoned. For days afterwards a persecution of Jews swept through the surroundings of Cologne. In 1300, a wall was built around the Jewish Quarter, presumably paid for by the Jewish community itself, though the permission of the Archbishop would have been required.

In 1317 Pope John XXII started a rigorous campaign against the Jews and publicly declared that usurious interest (which meant any interest) should not be paid to Jews. In 1320, some inhabitants of Cologne tried to avoid the obligation to pay their debts to Jews by appealing to the legislation of the church. The Cologne Council thought necessary to act preemptively in regard to this apparently Church-sanctioned refusal to repay debts and took action in 1321 to limit interest due under penalty. In 1327, the council reiterated this ordinance and appealed directly against a papal decree directed specifically against Salomon of Basel. The same council referred in 1334 to the same letter of the pope and appealed to Archbishop Walram von Jülich for protection from a Jewish banker named Meyer of Siegburg who demanded payment of money from it. The action finished with the withdrawal of all city debts and the condemnation of Meyer to death. The councilmen were in debt to Meyer, and the archbishop kept the confiscated property of the condemned. In addition, the archbishop had also debts with Meyer and was able to cancel them in the same way.

Altogether the Jews of Cologne between 1096 and 1349 appear indeed to have been relatively safe regarding life and physical condition as "fellow citizens (Mitbürger)". However, there is substantial evidence of a generally diffused feeling of antagonism against them. For instance, the infamous so-called "Jewish sow", made presumably around 1320, appears on a wooden choir stall of Cologne Cathedral

From 1266 the Cologne Jews had the exclusive privilege of lending money, which was forbidden to Christians by Church law. Decisions between 1252 and 1320 address the legal status, protection, and taxation of the Cologne Jews.

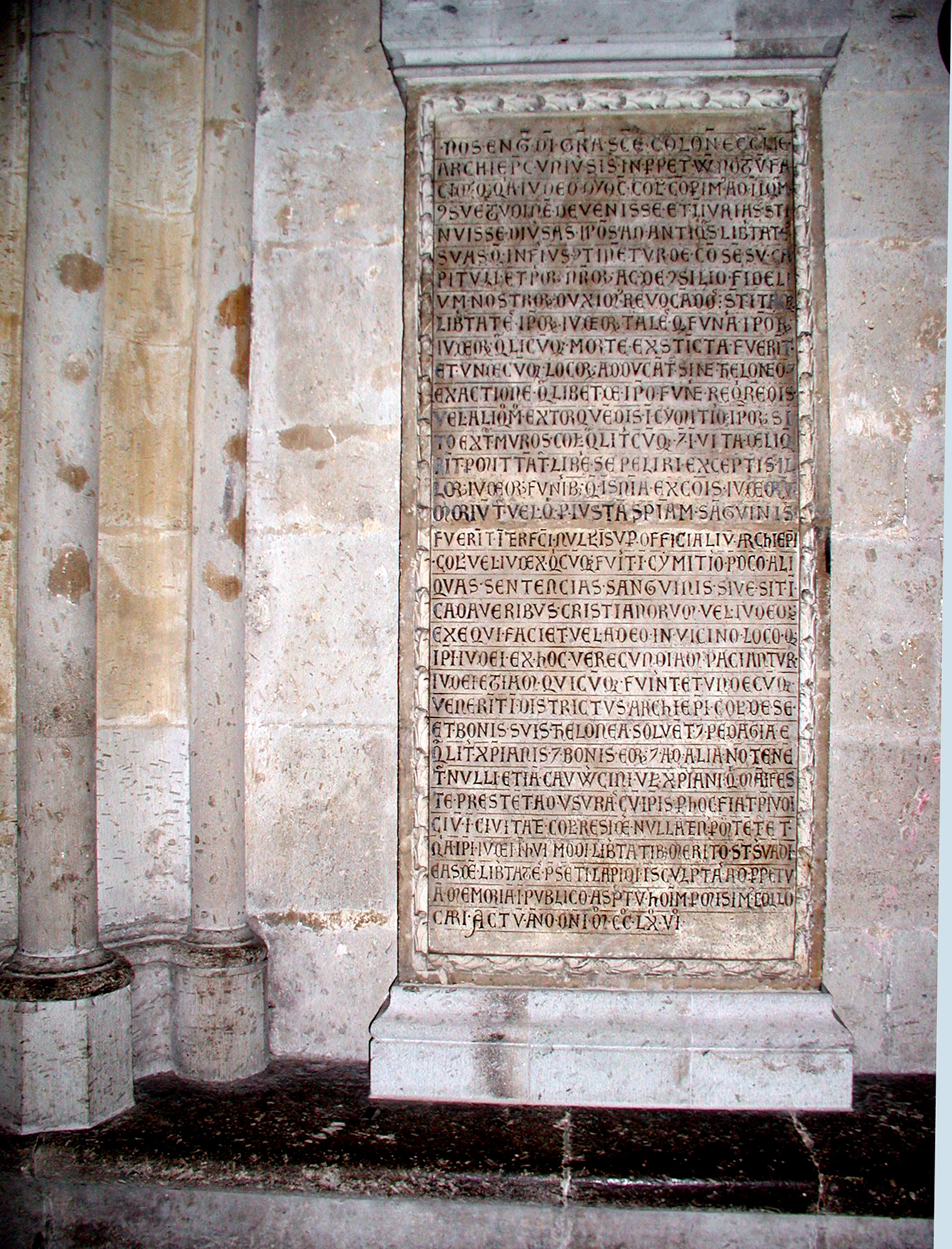
In 1266 the Archbishop Engelbert II von Falkenburg had the Judenprivileg carved in stone.

The Archbishop Engelbert II von Falkenburg had the Judenprivileg carved in stone on the outside of the cathedral treasure-room. In the years towards 1320 there are definite indications of religious hostility directed by the clergy of Cologne against the Jews for religious reasons, particularly roused by the privileges of the Cologne Jews. The reason for this can be seen in a change of the status of the Schutzjude. The Cologne clergy received no more profit from the loan transactions of the Jews. Increasingly the town council participated in the business, and this provoked additional frictions between the Archbishop and the Council. In the struggle for power, the Cologne Jews could also be used to a certain extent as a means of pressuring their clients. The protectors of the Cologne Jews, the Archbishop and the King, could sell the Schutzjude. There was a legal fight between the clergy, the king and the Cologne Council, so the council could deprive these rivals of a profitable source of revenue if they got rid of the Jews. Additionally some debts could be cancelled. Council decisions document the worsening climate between Christians and Jews.

==== Preparation of the pogrom ====
The persecution of the Jewish community at the time of the Black Death became the fiercest in the whole of the Middle Ages. In 1340, a terrible pestilence arrived in Europe. The Black Death had not reached Cologne until December 1349 However, reports of its devastating impact arrived on the Rhine from the south considerably earlier. Ultimately, between 30 and 60% of the European population died from the epidemic, provoking fears of an apocalyptic nature. Accusations that the plague was caused by a conspiracy of the Jews to poison the wells (accusations that were not proven in a single case) apparently had origin in southern France, but quickly snowballed across the Continent. They formed the background for a murderous pogrom on 23/24 August 1349 in Cologne.

There is a letter of the Cologne Council to the council of Strassburg, in which the Cologne Council expresses concern about an anti-Jewish incident in Strassburg and warns insistently against an escalation. The Jews and their possessions were protected by letters of protection or consolation, which had to be considered. In the same letter the Cologne Council make clear that they would decidedly protect their own Jews. The council of Strassburg, however, having initially taken a stand against the persecutions, was itself attacked and replaced by the populace; the new council of Strassburg invoked the public peace and called on all the citizens to kill the Jews throughout their territory. This development was not lost on the town council of Cologne.

Unlike most other anti-Jewish persecutions at the time, the pogrom in Cologne was not spontaneous and did not originate among the lower ranks of Cologne's population. Rather, it appears to have been premeditated, as there is clear evidence of the involvement of the leading social figures, or at least some of them. Inspired by the aforementioned events in Strassburg, which the Cologne Council watched closely, the pogrom appears to have been methodically planned. The council members had previously formed an alliance with all that could have an advantage from the killing or expulsion of the Jews in order to secure themselves against the Jews' official protectors, particularly Charles IV (then King of the Romans) and the Habsburg Vögte. This indicates that the pogrom was ultimately aimed against the Habsburgs and exploited the panic among the population simply to reach its goals of political power.

The Archbishop of Cologne, Walram von Jülich, who had left the city at the end of June 1349 to go to France, died in Paris after a short time. Charles IV had stayed in Cologne until 19 June and had left with his entourage. He had succeeded in securing his interests in Cologne by showing favoritism in crown disputes, undoubtedly not to the advantage of every interest in the archbishopric. The extermination of the Jewish community thus would serve to weaken the positions of both Charles IV and the clergy by associating them with a group already despised by the populace. In August 1349 not only was the see of the archbishop vacant, but Charles IV was not near enough to take action. On 23–24 August the relative security of Jews in Cologne came to an end. The Jews, who had already faced slaughter in the surrounding territories, were now also killed in Cologne itself.

==== Night of Bartholomew and its consequences ====
The actual outcome of the pogrom is not well known. In the course of St. Bartholomew's Night in 1349 the Jewish quarter near the town-hall (Rathaus) was attacked, after which killing, plundering of Jewish properties, and arson followed. Fugitives were pursued and struck down. Though partly contradictory of each other, many sources testify to the calamity. Some report that the Jews themselves set fire to their houses so as not to fall into the hands of the looters. Another version has it that the Jews burned themselves in their synagogue, which is rather improbable. Archeological excavations in the area of the medieval Jewish quarter have suggested that the synagogue itself was standing without damage after the night, but that it was plundered later. In its escape from the riot one family buried its belongings and merchandise. The hoard of coins was discovered during excavations in 1954 and is now exhibited in the Kölnisches Stadtmuseum.

The account of the chronicler Gilles Li Muisis, which tells of a regular battle of the citizenry against more than 25,000 Jews and credits the victory to the stratagem of a butcher, is not considered reliable. Nevertheless, Li Muisis' account coined the term Judenschlacht (the Jews' Battle) for the events of that night. Equally unlikely is the involvement of the Flagellants who, according to some sources, were supposedly present in Cologne in 1349. Throughout the proceedings, the council refused to act. Nevertheless, after the violence had died down, the council and the new archbishop Willem van Gennep condemned the pogrom with the utmost severity. The names of the real wire-pullers and of the violent invaders of the Jewish quarter remained unknown. It can only be definitively stated that the council disclaimed any responsibility for the riots: a declaration of the council laid the blame on an out-of-town mob followed by only a few no-accounts from Cologne." A few of the Jewish survivors expelled from the town looked for refuge across the Rhine. Around ten years after the pogrom of 1349, Jewish settlements are documented in Andernach and Siegburg.

The Jews can be documented to have returned only in 1369, although Archbishop Boemund II of Saarbrücken had already tried to enforce the return of the Jews on the city during his reign (1354 to 1361). Nevertheless, it was only under Engelbert III von der Mark and particularly under his coadjutor Cuno of Falkenstein that the strained relation between the archbishop and the municipality had improved enough for the protection of Jews to seem reasonably assured. There is proof that by 1372 a small Jewish community had again sprung up in Cologne.

At the request of Archbishop Frederick the Jews were admitted to the town and obtained a temporary protection privilege for ten years. To this, however, the Council attached some conditions. For the privilege of admission there was a tax between 50 and 500 florins, with a new sum specifiable every year to be paid as a general contribution. After further extensions of the right of residence the Council proclaimed in 1404 a more restrictive Judenordnung. It ordained that the Jews had to be recognizable by wearing a pointed Jewish hat and banned any displays of luxury on their part. In 1423 the Cologne Council decided not to extend the temporary right of residence, which expired in October 1424. Nevertheless, it is remarkable that an attempt was made immediately to re-establish a full community, rather than allowing only a few Jews to settle at a time, as was the procedure of most other large towns.

==== Emigration ====
In 1424, Jews were banned from the town "for eternity". Following the medieval pogroms and expulsion of 1424, many Jews of Cologne emigrated to central or northern European countries like Poland and Lithuania, then part of the Ordensstaat of the Teutonic Order. The offspring of these emigrants returned to Cologne at the beginning of the 19th century and lived mainly in the area of Thieboldsgasse on the southeast side of Neumarkt. Only a few Jews remained near Cologne and settled predominantly on the eastern bank of the Rhine (Deutz, Mülheim, Zündorf). Later new communities developed, which grew over the years. The first community in Deutz lived in the area of the present Minden Street (Mindener Straße). There Jews felt themselves safe under the protection of archbishop Dietrich von Moers (1414–1463).

The ban on Jewish settlement in Cologne was withdrawn at the end of the 18th century. A new Jewish community came into existence under the French administration. At the beginning of the Modern Age the area of the Jewish quarter was rebuilt and the previous inhabitants forgotten.

After the destruction of the community during Second World War, the medieval foundations were discovered, among them a synagogue and the monumental Cologne mikveh (ritual bath). The archeological survey was conducted after the war by Otto Doppelfeld from 1953 to 1956. On the basis of the awareness of history the area has not been reconstructed after the war and has remained as a square in front of the historical Rathaus. Today, the Jewish quarter is part of the "archeological zone of Cologne".

=== Cultural life in Middle Ages ===
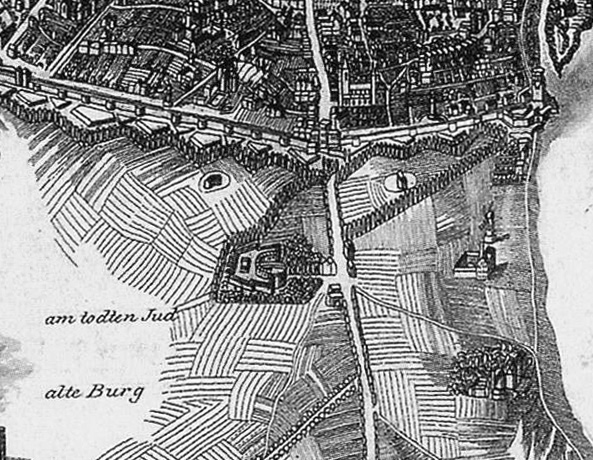
Detail of an engraving by Friedrich W. Delkeskamp (1794–1872)

In Cologne there was one of the largest Jewish library of Middle Ages. After the massacre of the Jews in York, England in 1190, a number of Hebrew books from there were brought to and sold in Cologne. There are a number of remarkable manuscripts and illuminations prepared by and for Jews of Cologne during the 12th to the 15th centuries and now kept in various libraries and museums throughout the world.

==== Distinguished Cologne Jews ====
According to the Jewish Encyclopedia, Cologne was a center of Jewish learning, and the "wise of Cologne" are frequently mentioned in rabbinical literature. A characteristic of the Talmudic authorities of that city was their liberality. Many liturgical poems still in the Ashkenazic ritual were composed by poets of Cologne.

Here are the names of many rabbis and scholars of the 11th and 12th centuries: the legendary Amram, traditional founder of the Talmudic school in the 10th century; R. Jacob ben Yaḳḳar, disciple of Gerson Meor ha-Golah (1050); the liturgist Eliakim ben Joseph; Eliezer ben Nathan (1070–1152), the chronicler of the First Crusade; the poet Eliezer ben Simson, who, together with the last named, took part in the famous assembly of French and German rabbis about the mid-12th century; the Tosafist Samuel ben Natronai and his son Mordecai; the liturgist Joel ben Isaac ha-Levi (d. 1200); Uri ben Eliakim (mid-12th century); Ephraim ben Jacob of Bonn (b. 1132), the chronicler of the Second Crusade. The last lost at Cologne, in 1171, his son Eliakim, a promising youth, who was murdered in the street. His tombstone is still to be seen in the cemetery of Cologne.

Among the rabbis and scholars of the 13th century were: Eliezer ben Joel ha-Levi; Uri ben Joel ha-Levi; Jehiel ben Uri, father of R. Asher; Isaac ben Simson (martyred in 1266); Isaac ben Abraham, brother of the Tosafist Simson ben Abraham of Sens (martyred in 1266 at Sinzig); R. Isaiah ben Nehemiah (also martyred in 1266 at Sinzig); the liturgist Eliezer ben Ḥayyim; Ḥayyim ben Jehiel (d. 1314) and Asher ben Jehiel (b. c. 1250; d. 1327); Yaḳḳar ben Samuel ha-Levi; Reuben ben Hezekiah of Boppard; Abraham ben Samuel; Judah ben Meïr; Samuel ben Joseph; Ḥayyim ben Shaltiel; Nathan ben Joel ha-Levi; Jacob Azriel ben Asher ha-Levi; Meïr ben Moses; Eliezer ben Judah ha-Kohen, most of whom are known as commentators on the Bible.

The rabbis and scholars of the 14th century include: Samuel ben Menahem, Talmudist and liturgist; Jedidiah ben Israel, disciple of Meïr of Rothenburg; and Mordecai ben Samuel. These three are called in the municipal sources "Gottschalk", "Moyter", and "Süsskind". The rabbi who officiated at the time of the banishment was Jekuthiel ben Moses Möln ha-Levi.

In Middle Ages there were in Cologne the following buildings, synagogues, mikvehs, schools, hospices and cemeteries:

==== Judenbüchel ====
In 1174 a document of Saint Engelbert, at the time provost of the monastery of Saint Severin in Cologne, mentions that thirty-eight years previously Knight Ortliv had given back five jugerum of land that he had received from the monastery as a fief near the Jews cemetery, and the land had been let to the Jews against a yearly payment of four denarii and Ortliv could not have any claim on it. In 1266 Archbishop Engelbert II von Falkenburg ensured the lawful management and undisturbed usage of their cemetery on Bonner Strasse. It was located outside the walls of Cologne towards the south near Severinstores, called Judenbüchel or Toten Juden. This name remained to the area also after the removal of the cemetery until the construction of the supermarket in this place.

The cemetery measured 29,000 square meters. In 1096 Salomon ben Simeon mentions the tombstones of the Jews buried there. In 1146 Rabbi Simeon of Trier was buried in the cemetery by the leaders of the Cologne Jewish community. The earliest tombstone still in existence dates from the year 1152. After 1349 the tombstones were considered owner-less; some of them were torn out of their places and used by Archbishop William de Gunnep for the construction of the fortress of Lechenig or in Huelchrath. After 1372 the Jews of Cologne again were granted the use of the cemetery and it was used until 1693 mainly by the Jews of Deutz.

==== Tombstones of 1323 ====
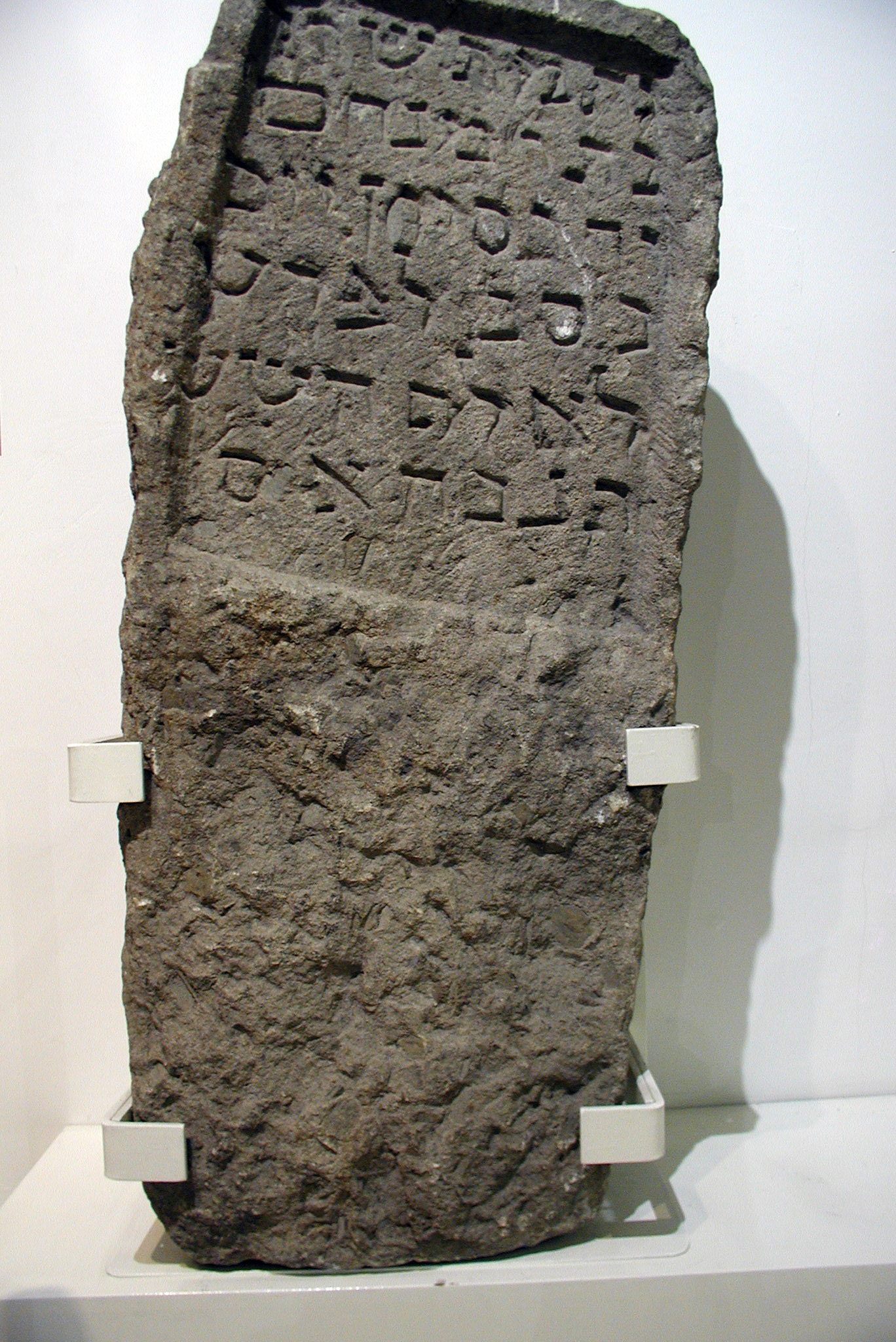
Tombstone of Rachel, 1323 (See image description.)

By excavations of the area of the Cologne Rathaus in 1953 two fully conserved tombstones were found on the northwest corner of the building in a large bomb crater. They probably came from the Jewish cemetery of Judenbüchel and were used as building material. The inscription of the tombstone of Rachel says: "Rachel, daughter of R. Schneior, died on Tuesday, the 16 Elul of the year 83 of the sixth millennium. Her soul be tied in the union of eternal life. Amen. Sela"

== Modern times ==
=== After the expulsion ===
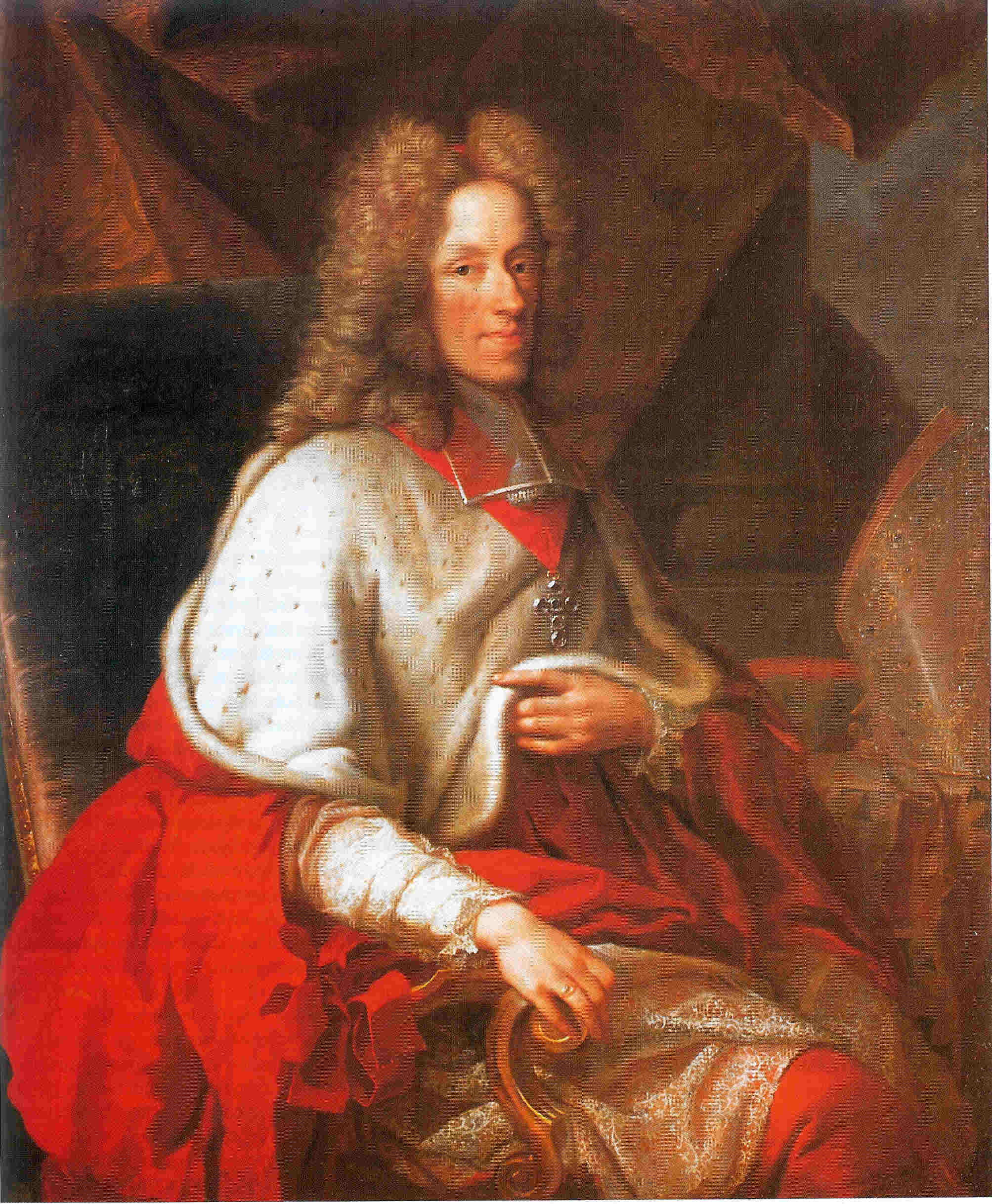
Joseph Clemens of Bavaria granted privileges to the Jews

The few Jews who remained in the city began to re-establish a community in right-Rhenish Deutz, whose rabbi called himself later "Country Rabbi of Cologne" (Landesrabbiner). Rabbi Vives was known by this title during the mid-15th century.

In 1634, there were 17 Jews in Deutz, in 1659 there were 24 houses inhabited by Jews and in 1764 the community consisted of 19 people. Towards the end of the 18th century the community still consisted of 19 people.

The community was located in a small Jewish "quarter" in the area of Mindener and Hallenstraße. A synagogue, first mentioned in 1426, was damaged by the immense ice drift of the Rhine in 1784. The mikveh associated with the synagogue probably still exists under the embankment of the Brückenrampe (Deutzer Bridge). This first synagogue was then replaced by a new small building on the west end of Freiheit, the today's street Deutzer Freiheit (1786–1914).

The Jews of the Deutz community lived like all the others of the Electorate of Cologne under the legal and society conditions, that were provided by the state from the end of the 16th century through a so-called Judenordnung. The last issue of this laws for the Jews was the Order of 1700 by Kurfürst (elector of the Holy Roman Empire) Joseph Clemens. They were kept until new legislation came also in Deutz, with the adoption of the Napoleonic Code.

During the construction of the Deutzer Hängebrücke in 1913/14, the synagogue was abandoned and demolished. In December 1913, during works to remove the "Schiffsbrückenstraßenbahnlinie" in Deutz on the Freiheitsstraße, a mikveh was found under the old synagogue. The bath had a link to the water of the Rhine.

==== Deutz Cemetery ====
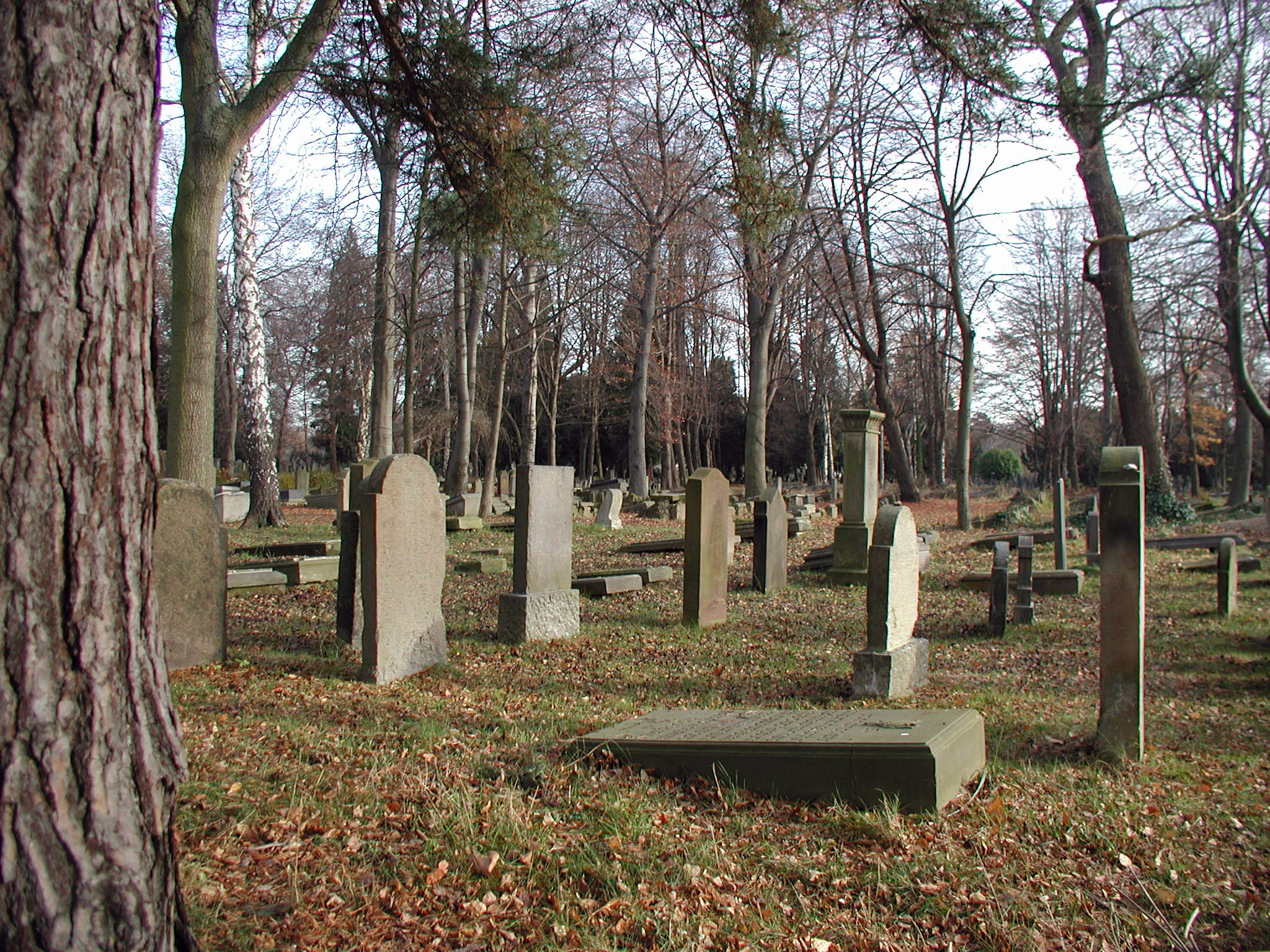
Tombstones and tombs aligned towards north-east

In contrast to the building evidence in Innenstadt, the history of the Jewish communities outside the city center is revealed above all through the remains of the Jewish cemeteries. There are right-Rhenish Jewish cemetery in Mülheim, "Am Springborn", in Zündorf between "Hasenkaul" and the "Gartenweg", and one in Deutz im "Judenkirchhofsweg". The last was given to the Jews of Deutz by Archbishop Joseph Clemens of Bavaria in 1695 as a rented land. The first burials took place in 1699. When in 1798 the Jews were again permitted to settle within the old city walls of Cologne, the cemetery was also used by this community until 1918.

=== Comeback ===
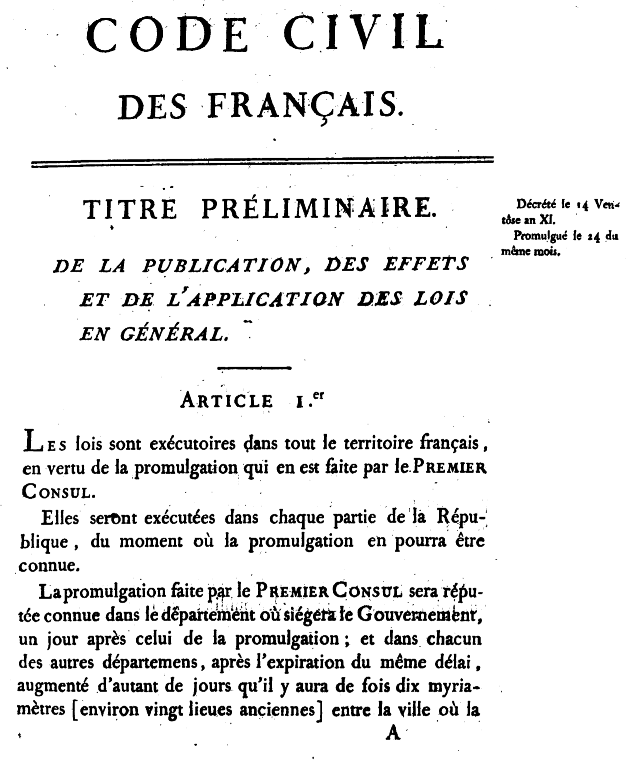
First page of the first edition of the French Code Civil of 1804

Until the French annexion of Cologne in 1794, following the French Revolution, no Jew was permitted to settle in Cologne. The Napoleonic Code included equality before the law, rights of individual freedom and the separation of church and state. The Government Commissioner Rudler, in his proclamation of June 21, 1798 to the inhabitants of the conquered territory announced: "Whatever smacks of slavery is abolished. Only before God will you have to give an accounting of your religious beliefs. Your civic rights will no longer depend upon your creeds. Whatever these are, they will be tolerated without distinctions and enjoy equal protection."

A few months earlier, Joseph Isaac of Mühlheim on the Rhine had sought civic rights from the Magistracy of Cologne. Since he presented favorable evidence of his previous conduct and also proved that he would not become a burden to the city because of poverty, permission was granted to him on March 16, 1798, to settle in Cologne. The rest of his requests for civic rights were refused because French regulations had not yet come into force. He was followed by Samuel Benjamin Cohen of Bonn, son of the Chief Rabbi Simha Brunem. At the same time, the 17-year-old Salomon Oppenheim Jr. moved his businesses from Bonn to Cologne. He belonged to the families who built the first Cologne community of modern times. Oppenheim Jr. traded with cotton, linen, oil, wine and tobacco but his main activity was banking. Already in 1810 his bank was the second largest in Cologne after "Abraham Schaffhausen". Within the new Cologne Jewish community, Oppenheim Jr. took an outstanding position in the social and political life. He was in charge of the community school but he was also the deputy of the Cologne community, who sent him to the congress of Jewish Notables in Paris in 1806–1807.

A modest hall of prayer was built inside the court of the former Monastery of St. Clarissa in Glockengasse. The land was bought by Benjamin Samuel Cohen, one of the Jewish communal leaders in the early 1800s, taking advantage of a property sale by the French tax-office. Even if in those times a row of Jewish business people experienced an economic and social rise—Oppenheim Jr. was elected unanimously to be a member of the Chamber of Commerce and had for the first time as a Jew a public office—their legal status was insecure.

The Prussian Jews Edict of March 11, 1812 did not apply everywhere. It lasted until the Prussian Jewish Law of 1847 and finally until 1848, with the adoption of the constitutional charter for the Prussian State, the special status of the Jews was definitely abolished and a complete equality of rights with all other citizens was attained. During the Revolutions of 1848 in the German states in 1848/49 there were strong anti-Jewish excesses in Eastern and South-eastern German regions and towns like Berlin, Prag and Vienna—but also Cologne.

Due to the growth of the community and the disrepair of the prayer hall in the former Monastery of St. Clarissa, the Oppenheim family donated a new synagogue building at Glockengasse 7. The number of the members of the community was now about of 1,000 adults. While in medieval times the "quarter" had been built close to the synagogue in Cologne "Judengasse", by now the Jews lived in a decentralized area among the rest of the population. Many lived in the new periphery quarters near the city walls.

Due to further growth of the Jewish population, more new constructions followed the one in Glockengasse. The orthodox synagogue in St. Apern Straße was dedicated on January 16, 1884; the liberal synagogue in Roonstraße was dedicated on March 22, 1899.

In the face of historical experiences in Europe, the Jews started initiatives to create their own state. The head office of the Zionist Organization for Germany was based in Richmodstraße near Neumarkt square, Cologne, and was founded by lawyer Max Bodenheimer together with merchant David Wolffsohn. Bodeheimer was president until 1910 and worked for Zionism with Theodor Herzl. The "Kölner Thesen" developed under Bodenheimer for Zionism were — with few adjustments — adopted as the "Basel Program" by the first Zionist Congress. The goal of the organization was to obtain the foundation of a distinct state of Israel in Palestine for all the Jews of the world.

==== The synagogue in Glockengasse ====
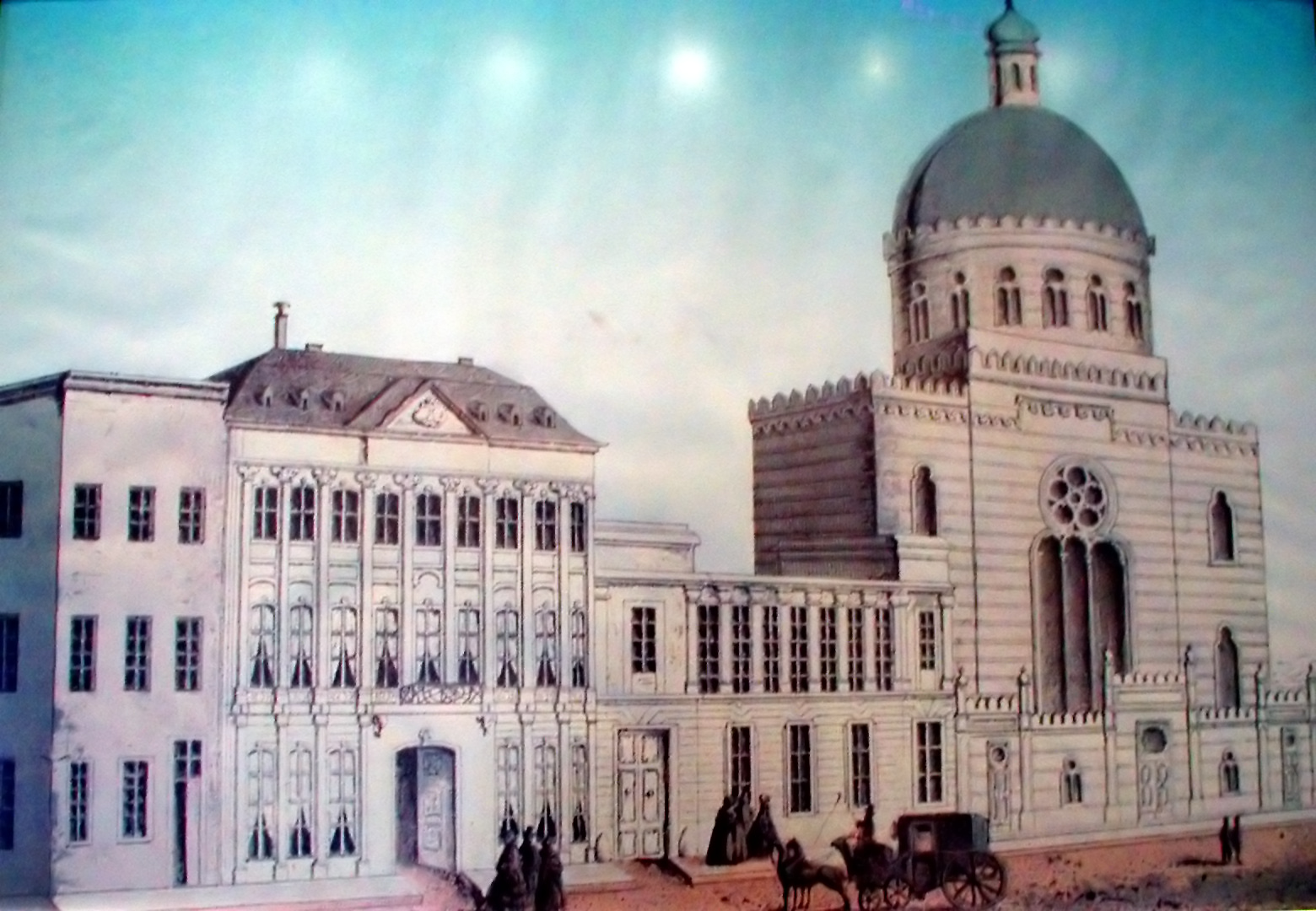
Glockengasse Synagogue in the 19th century

After the constant growth of the community the hall of prayer at Glockengasse was overloaded. A donation of the Cologne banker Abraham Oppenheim of around 600,000 thalers allowed the construction of a new synagogue. The project was won by Ernst Friedrich Zwirner, leading architect of the Cathedral of Cologne, who designed a building in Moorish style. The new synagoge was inaugurated after four years of construction in August 1861. The inner and outside design was to remind the bloom of Jewish culture during 11th-century Moorish Spain. The new synagogue had a façade of light sandstone with red horizontal stripes as well as oriental minaret and a cupola covered with copper plates. The ornaments in the inside were inspired by the Alhambra of Granada. The new synagogue, which was valued positively by Cologne people, had seats for 226 men and 140 women.

While set on fire in November 1938, the rolls of the Torah of 1902 could be saved, thanks to the Cologne priest Gustav Meinertz. After the war they were placed in a glass cabinet in Roonstrasse Synagogue. After a restoration, carried out in Jerusalem in 2007, they are now used again in the liturgies in Roonstrasse Synagogue, rebuilt after the war.

==== The orthodox synagogue in St. Apern-Straße ====
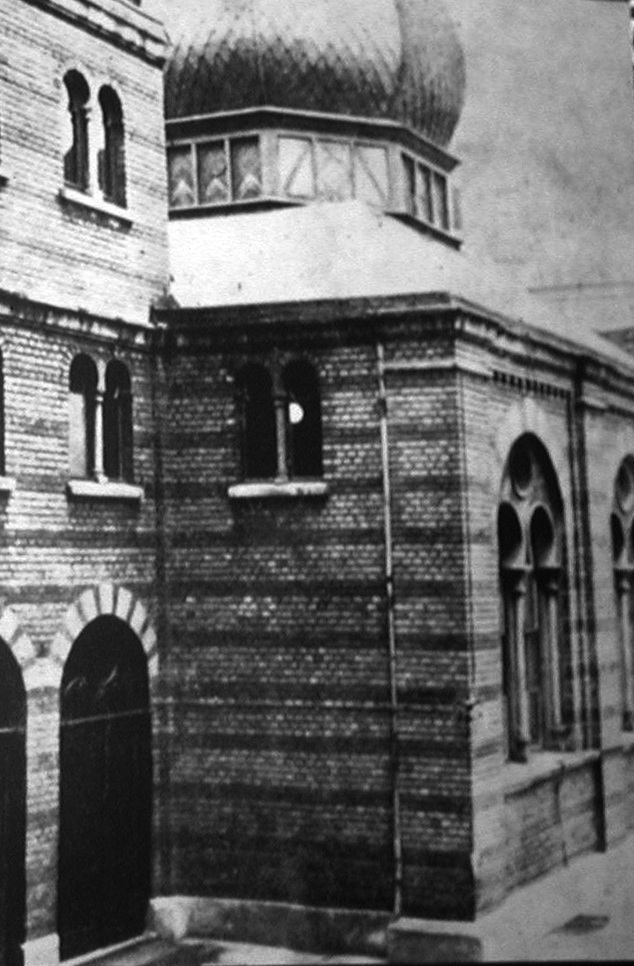
Synagogue Adass-Jeschurun

The St. Aper Straße Synagogue already existed during the middle of the 18th century. It was located in a mixed-use area, appreciated by affluent citizens. There were many exquisite antique shops, in which mostly Jewish owners sold expensive furniture and jewels. In 1884, these inhabitants built a synagogue of the orthodox community "Adass Jeschurun". The last rabbi was Isidor Caro who died in Theresienstadt concentration camp.

In the associated Jawne School, a Jewish school, there were courses from 1919 to 1941. It was the first and only Jewish gymnasium in the Rhineland.

==== The liberal synagogue in Roonstraße ====
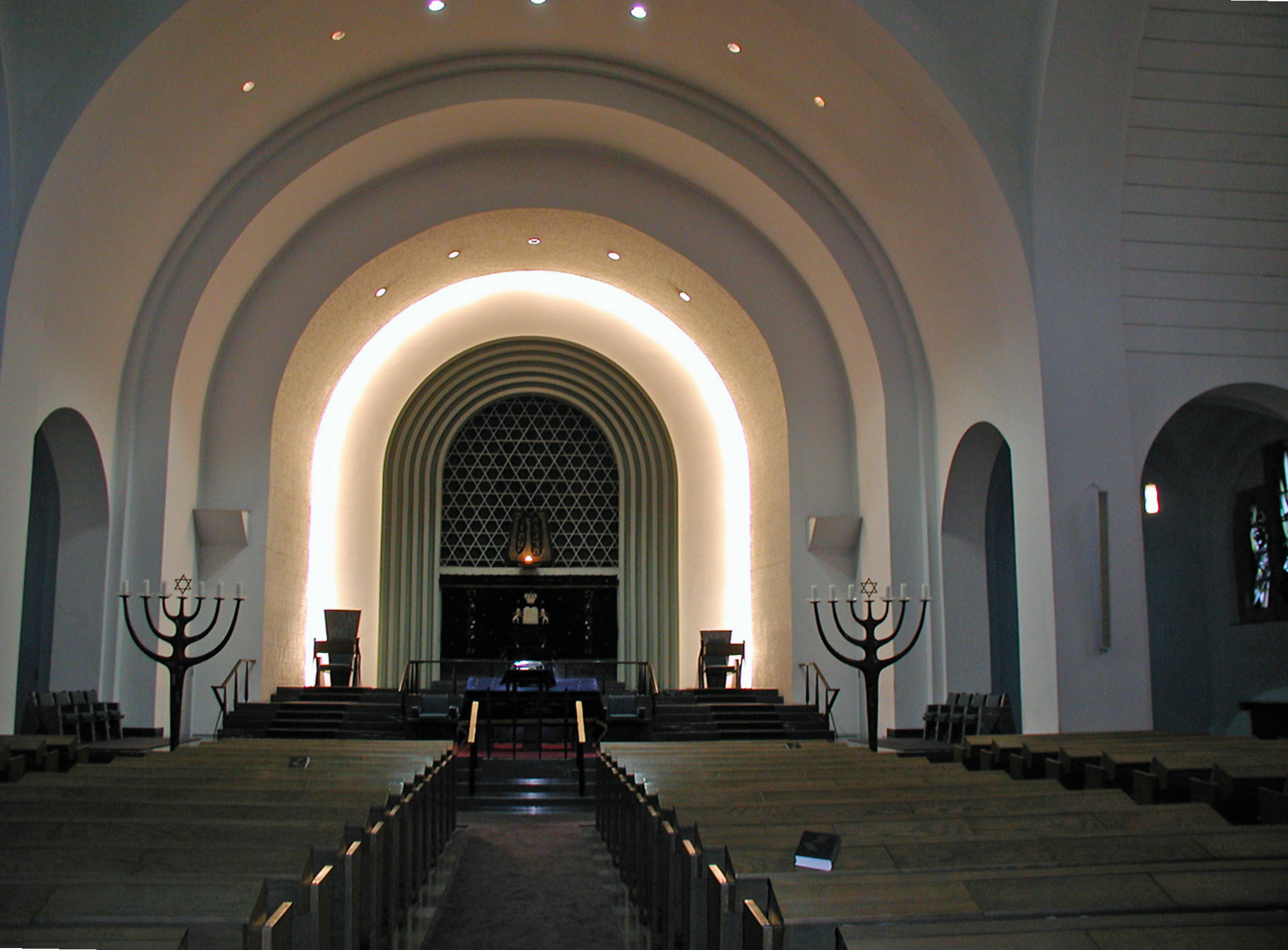
view of the Torah ark and the Bimah (Torabookrest)

By the end of 1899, the Jewish community in Cologne had grown to 9,745 members. Already in 1893, the community had bought a piece of land on Roonstraße — opposite the Königsplatz. In 1894, the Representative Assembly of the city voted for a grant of 40,000 marks from the city treasury. It was estimated that the cost of the new building would be about 550,000 marks. To cover this sum a substantial loan was made with the "Prussian Zentralbodenkredit Aktiengesellshaft". The synagogue was finished in 1899 and had places for 763 men and 587 women in the gallery. A historical photo was considered worth to be put in the photo archive of the Israeli Holocaust Memorial Yad Vashem. The final Rabbi of the Roonstrasse Synagogue before the war was Rabbi Dr. Adolf Kober. The structure has been seriously damaged during the war but it was decided to rebuild it. The reopened synagogue was dedicated on September 20, 1959.

==== The synagogue in Reischplatz in Deutz ====
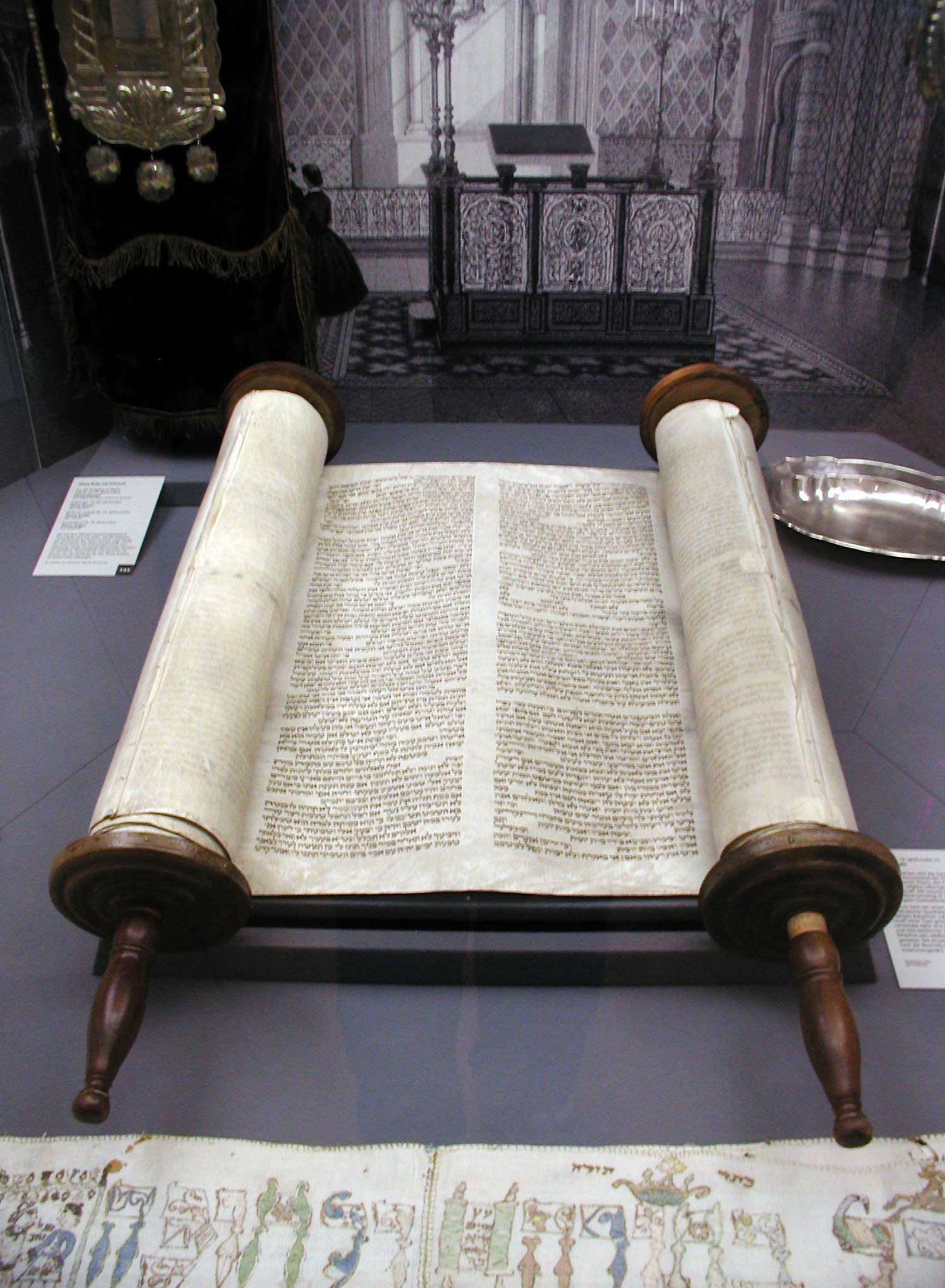
The Tora (presumably 18th century) of the Synagogue in Deutz, bought by the town in 1926 (Zeughaus)

The last synagogue was built in Reischplatz in Deutz. The building was dedicated in 1915 and, after the damages of the last war, was rebuilt in another form and with a new usage, as there was no more Jewish community in Deutz. A commemorative plaque remembers the Deutz community and its last synagogue.

==== The synagogue in Mülheim ====
The first synagogue of the community of Köln-Mülheim was damaged by a Rhine flood in 1784 — as was the one in Deutz. A new synagogue was dedicated in the same place a few years later, designed by the master-builder Wilhelm Hellwig in 1788/1789. The disposition of the construction began on the street with a school, on which a synagogue was attached with a hip roof on four sides. The building survived the 1938 pogrom but was damaged during the war and demolished in 1956.

==== Jewish community in Zündorf ====
The synagogue in Niederzündorf was at the beginning a prayer room, that had not enough space after the strong growth of the community in the 19th century. In 1882 a new building was completed, and the "Zündorfer Pfarrchronik" wrote:

"The Jewish synagogue has been finished after much effort, the ceremony took place with the participation of many foreign Jews."

The land (today Hauptstr. 159) was sold and partly donated to the community by two Jewish business people from there, "Lazarus Meyer" und "Simon Salomon". The Pfarrchronik also wrote:

"The Jews built a synagogue, that is a room, a chamber that served as a synagogue. The offering from the Jews of the Rhine province has supposedly reached a meager result."

==== Other buildings and meeting houses ====
- Jewish asylum for ill and old people in Silvanstraße (Severinsviertel), later Ottostraße, Ehrenfeld.
- Community and meeting houses located in Innenstadt, south of the Neumarkt, in Bayardgasse, in Thieboldsgasse, Agrippastraße and Quirinstraße behind the Church of St. Pantaleon. These houses were also meeting points for Jews who came to Cologne from East European countries.

==== Jewish cemetery at Melaten ====
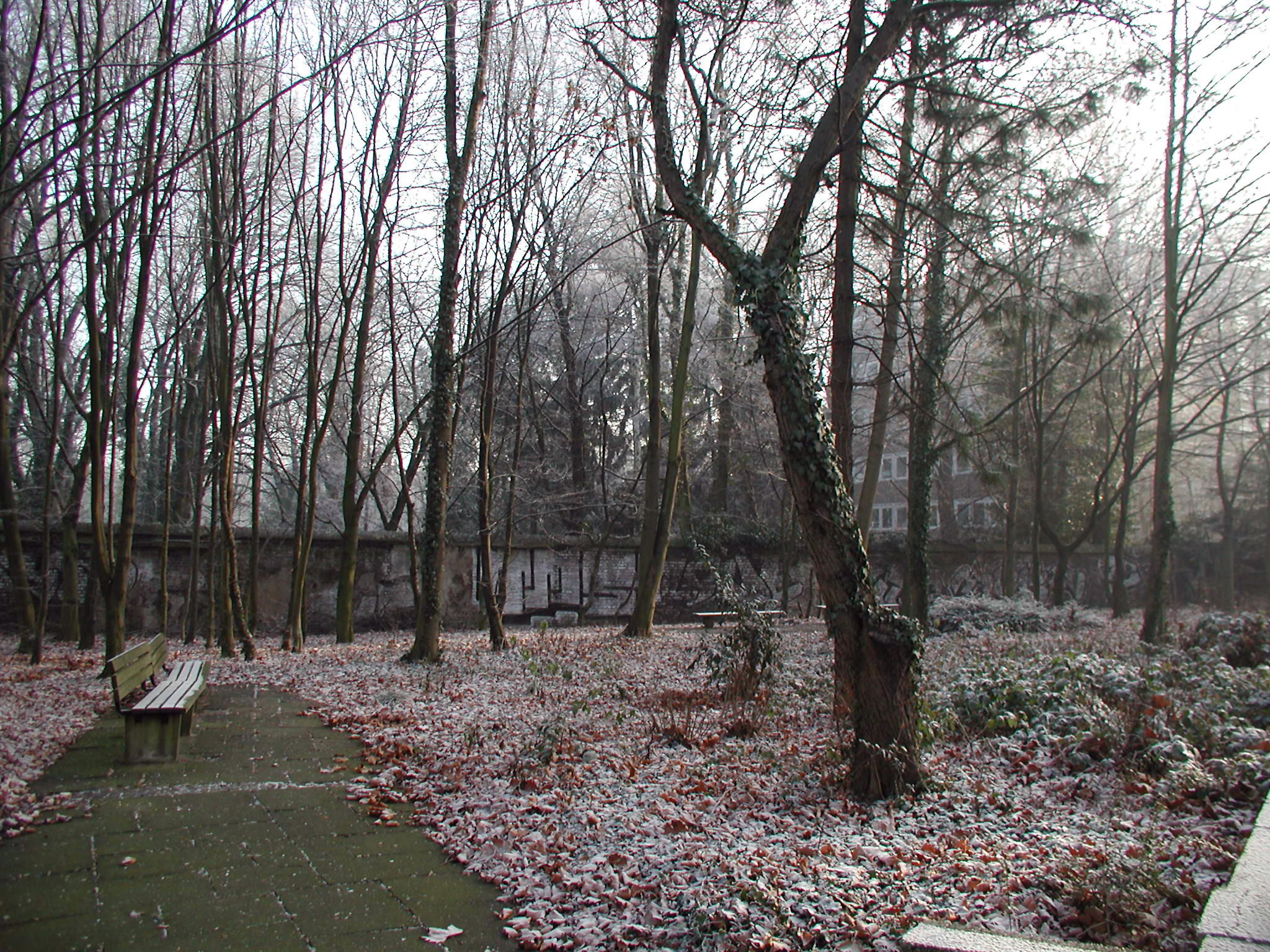
Jewish cemetery Friedhof at Melatengürtel (near the Gerichtsmedizin)

It is not clear in which year a Jewish cemetery was created as part of the large cemetery of Melaten. Until 1829, only Catholics could be buried there, while Protestants were buried in the old Geusen cemetery in Weyertal. The Jewish community buried its dead people until 1918 in Deutz and then in Bocklemünd. However, in 1899 also a section of Melaten cemetery was reserved to the Jews. In 1899 there was the first burial. A part of the piece of land bordering a high wall can still be seen from the Melatengürtel street. In 1928, the cemetery was violated for the first time, in 1938 the mortuary chapel was destroyed.

==== Deckstein cemetery ====
Located in Köln-Lindenthal, behind the area of the old Deckstein cemetery, this cemetery was created in 1910 from the community "Adass Jeschurun". Because the Adass Jeschurun oppose any concessions to Christian rituals, there is no burial in a coffin or urn. Also, flower decorations or wreaths are uncommon there. The tombstones of the cemetery are very sober and predominantly engraved with Hebrew letters. Entry is not open to the public (a permit needs to be obtained from the Synagogengemeinde Köln).

=== Integration and business community ===
The Jewish business community was optimistic for the future. In 1891, the merchant Leonhard Tietz opened a department store on Hohe Straße. The banks of Seligmann and the Oppenheim family flourished. The store of textile wholesale company "Gebrüder Bing und Söhne" opened on the Neumarkt. Exquisite shops of Jewish merchants were situated around the cathedral on Hohe Straße and Schildergasse.

By the middle of the 19th century, Cologne developed into a scientific, economic and cultural centre, and the Jewish community had a strong part in this development. After Jewish citizens had taken their place in the financial and commercial world, and while being respected and recognized most places, they also tried to contribute in the forming of the political opinion. For example, Moses Hess and Karl Marx in 1842 wrote in the newly established "Rheinische Zeitung". They were among the leading contributors to this newspaper, dedicated to "politics, business and trade". In 1863, Hess, in his article "Rome and Jerusalem", tried to present a possibility of a resettlement of Jews in Palestine. His work, however, found little approval, with Jews in Germany, especially in large cities like Cologne, considering Germany as their country of origin and home.

=== First World War and Weimar Republic ===
Just at the beginning of the First World War, the Jewish associations called their members to stand up for Germany. However the existing ressentiment against Jews participating to the war was so strong, especially among officers, that the Ministry of War was compelled as a mediation to arrange a so-called Jewish census. At the end of the war in 1918, Adolf Kober took the place of rabbi of the Cologne community, which was one of the largest in Germany. Kober was one of the co-sponsors of the exhibition of the Jewish history in the "Millennium-Exhibition of the Rhineland", that took place at the Cologne trade fairgrounds in 1925. By 1918 the Jewish cemetery of Bocklemünd was opened, which is still in use today.

== Nazism and World War II ==
With the takeover of the political power by the Nazis repression against the Jewish citizens of Cologne started again. In spring 1933, 15,000 inhabitants declared on the population census that they were Jewish. There were 6 synagogues and other community and meeting places in Cologne, which were all violated in the Kristallnacht on 9 November 1938 and were completely destroyed after the war, until the reconstruction of the synagogue in Roonstraße.

=== Antisemitism in Cologne ===
Nazi and antisemitic attitudes were prevalent in Cologne's population and society, just as in the rest of Germany. After the war, politicians like Konrad Adenauer and writers like Heinrich Böll claimed that the people of Cologne demonstrated a spirit of defiance and sovereignty in the face of Nazism, stating that "no tyrant, no dictator can feel well in Cologne". A few residents of Cologne did openly oppose Nazism and hid Jews, such as the Ehrenfeld Group, but in general the persecution of Cologne Jews was well-accepted. Most plays and performances put on by the Hänneschen Theater and the Cologne Carnival at the time displayed clear antisemitism. Carnival carriages in the Rosenmontag (Shrove Monday) parade showed antisemitic themes and a carnival song mocked the Jews: "Metz dä Jüdde es jetz Schluß, Se wandere langsam uss. (...) Mir laachen uns für Freud noch halv kapott. Der Itzig und die Sahra trecke fott" (translation: "The Jews are finished, they slowly leave … We laugh our heads off at Freud, the Itzik and the Sarah run away".)

=== Aryanization ===
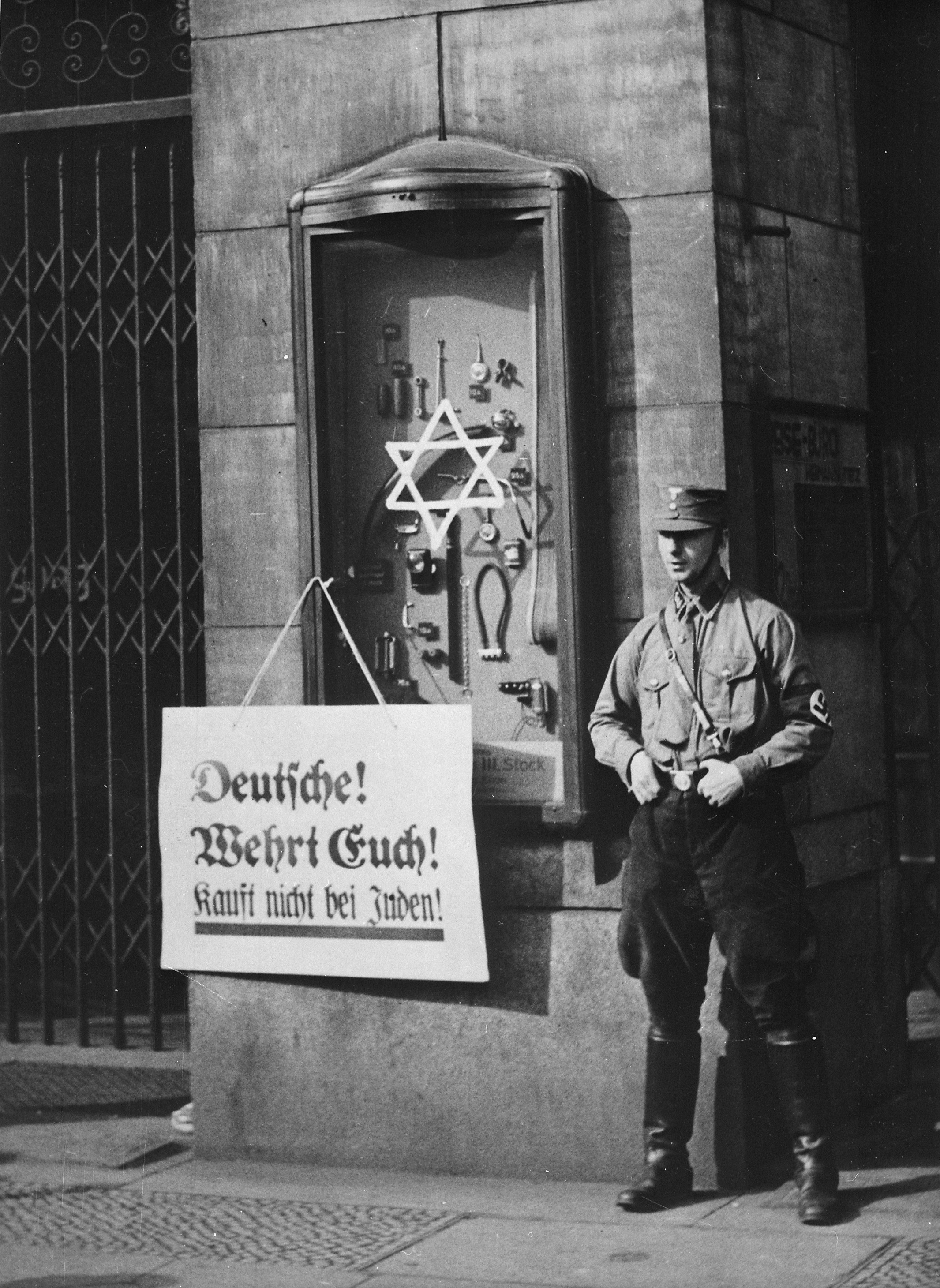
Boycott of Jewish shops on April 1, 1933

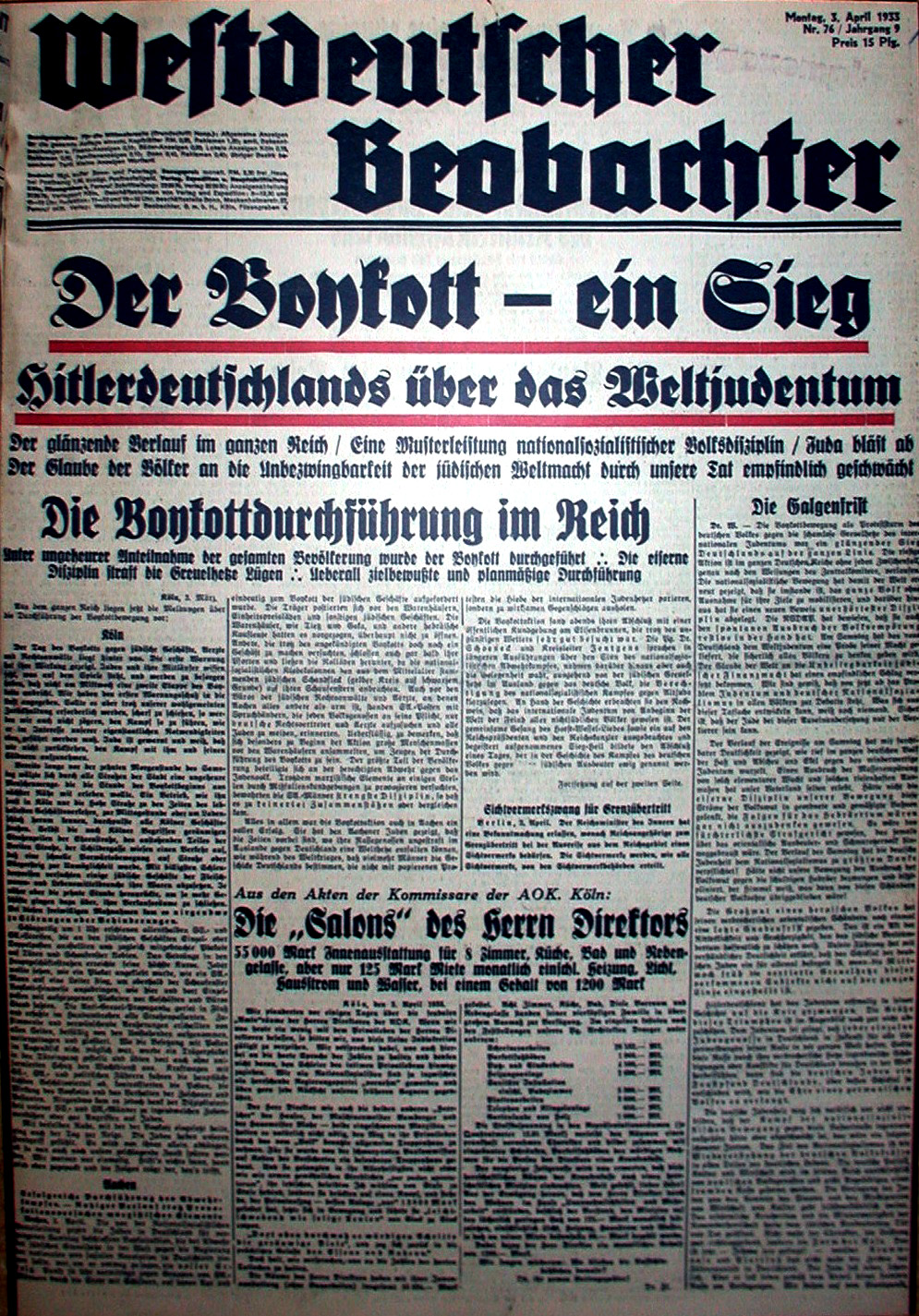
Boycott news in a newspaper in 1933

Aryanization, which was the expulsion of Jews from life in Germany and the transfer of Jewish property to non-Jews, happened in two phases: the first between 1933 and 1938, and the second from 1938 until the end of the war in 1945.

==== Phase One: 1933-1938 ====
The first phase, between January 1933 and November 1938, was misleadingly called the "voluntary" Aryanization. Nazi officials, eager to maintain a legal veneer to the seizure of Jewish property, pretended that transfer of property from a Jewish to a non-Jewish owner was "voluntary".

One process through which Jews were "convinced" to give their businesses over was the advertisement of German businesses as such on the one hand, with ads and flyers declaring "German Business" or "German Produce", and on the other, through painting stars of David and hate messages on the walls or windows of Jews businesses. Local Nazi groups published lists of companies with Jewish owners to incite persecution and boycotts to drive them out of business.

On April 1, 1933, the Nazis organized a boycott of Jewish businesses, blocking entrance to Jewish shops in Cologne. The Jewish merchant Richard Stern, who had fought in the first world war, distributed a leaflet against the boycott and stood next to the SA guard posted outside his door, proudly wearing his Iron Cross. Customers stopped shopping in Jewish-owned businesses and owners lost their means of existence. Newspapers filled announcements about bankruptcies and acquisitions of Jewish companies.

Jewish lawyers and doctors were also targeted by the anti-Jewish boycott. On 31 March the SA and SS assaulted Jewish lawyers in the Justice building on Reichensperger Platz in Cologne. Judges and lawyers were arrested, mistreated, then loaded on garbage trucks and taken around the city.

In October 1935 Jews were excluded from the benefits of the "Winterhelp of the German People", and a "Jewish Winterhelp" was organized as an autonomous organization. It collected money, food, clothing, furniture and fuel and in winter 1937/38 the organisation supported 2,300 indigent people, a fifth of Jewish community.

According to the U.S. Holocaust Museum Encyclopedia, "By 1938, the combination of Nazi terror, propaganda, boycott, and legislation was so effective that some two thirds of these Jewish-owned enterprises were out of business or sold to non-Jews. Jewish owners, often desperate to emigrate or to sell a failing business, accepted a selling price that was only 20 or 30 percent of the actual value of each business." Cologne followed this trend.

==== Phase Two: 1938-1945 ====
The second phase of Aryanization started after November 1938, with the Nazis openly seizing Jewish homes, businesses, and properties throughout Germany by force. In Cologne, over 735 houses and properties belonging to Jewish owners were confiscated by Nazis and transferred to non-Jews, between 1938 and 1944.

==== Examples of Aryanization in Cologne ====
Jewish-owned shops along with their owners were destroyed in preparation for the deportation and mass murder of Cologne's Jews in the Holocaust. Businesses both large and small were transferred from Jewish owners to non-Jewish owners in both phases of Aryanizations. A few example include:

- Brenner, the second largest photo accessories company in Germany, located in the Hohe Straße in Cologne, was forced to sell to a non-Jewish owner after the arrest of his owner, forced to sign a prepared purchase agreement while in prison in the presence of Gestapo and NSBO representatives on June 26, 1933.
- Bankhaus Sal. Oppenheim jr. & Cie
- Leonhard Tietz AG, Hohe Strasse
- Kaufhaus Julius Bluhm, Venloer Strasse
- numerous Jewish shops on the Hohe Straße and Schildergasse, where one in three shops were aryanized.
  - "Deka-Schuh, Leopold Dreyfuß" in Ehrenfeld,
  - Neckties wholesaler "Herbert Fröhlich" in the Streitzeuggasse
  - Butcher and snack bar "Katz-Rosenthal",
  - Fashion boutique "Michel" (later Jacobi)
  - "Bamberger" (later Hansen).

After World War II, many Cologne businesses ended up owning property that had been Aryanized from pre-war Jewish owners. In 2009, the publisher M. DuMont Schauberg took the German weekly Der Spiegel to court for suggesting that the publisher and family knew that it was acquiring three properties Aryanized from Cologne Jews, and Der Spiegel retracted the article.

=== Ehrenfeld ===
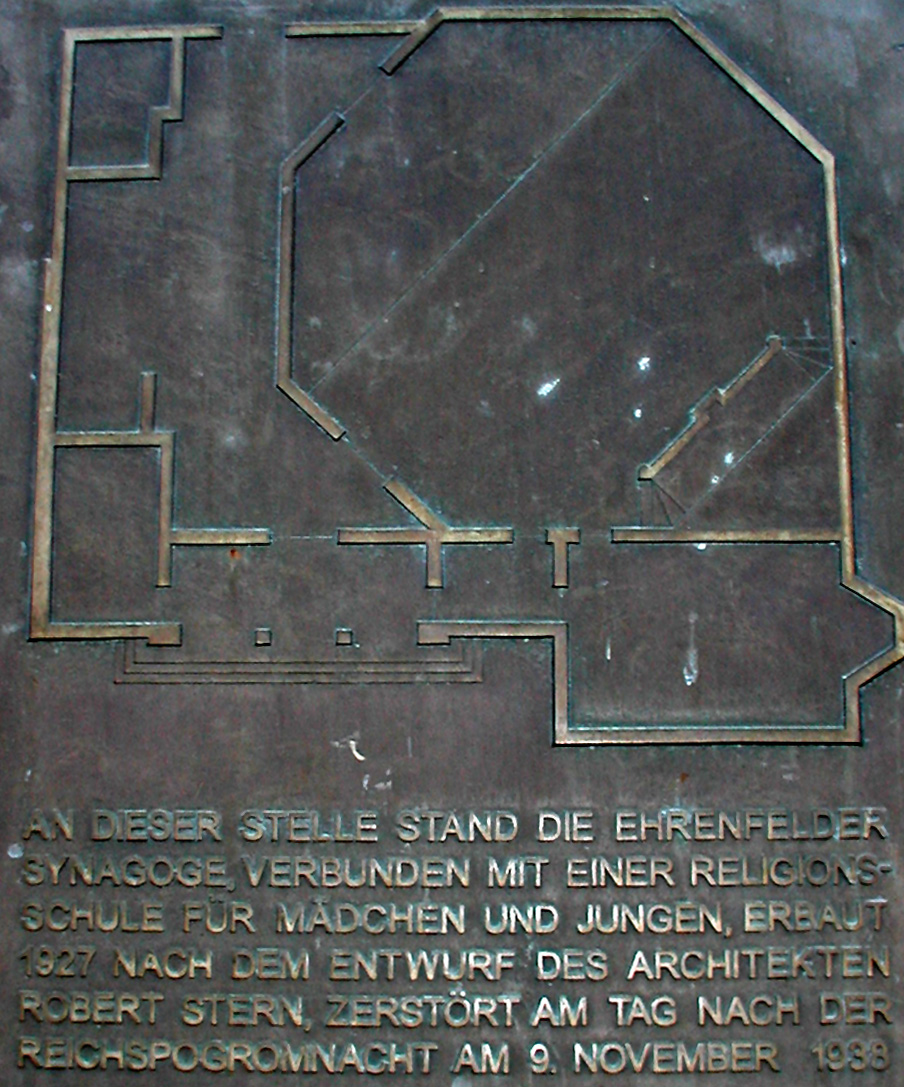
Memorial plaque - Synagogue in Körnerstraße

Although already in 1925 Cologne was the capital of the NSDAP-Gau of Cologne-Aachen, many didn't realize the growing radicalness of this party. Still in 1927 the synagogue in Körnerstraße was built as the last construction of the Jewish community of Cologne by the architect Robert Stern. It was dedicated to "the glory of God, the truth of faith and the peace of mankind". The synagogue had a small vestibule surrounded with arches. The prayer room had 200 seats for men and 100 for women. The latter were located in a women's gallery, as in many other places. The Jewish population in Ehrenfeld reached 2000 people. The synagogue had also a ritual bath, that was discovered through excavations in Körnerstraße.

A plaque in Körnerstraße remembers the destroyed synagogue and its attached religion school: "In this place there was the Synagogue of Ehrenfelder, connected to a Religion school for girls and boys, built in 1927 according to the plan of Architect Robert Stern, destroyed in the day after the pogrom of Kristallnacht on November 9, 1938"

At the place of the synagogue there is now an air-raid shelter, built in 1942–43, which has been protected as a historical monument since 1995.

=== Müngersdorf concentration camp ===
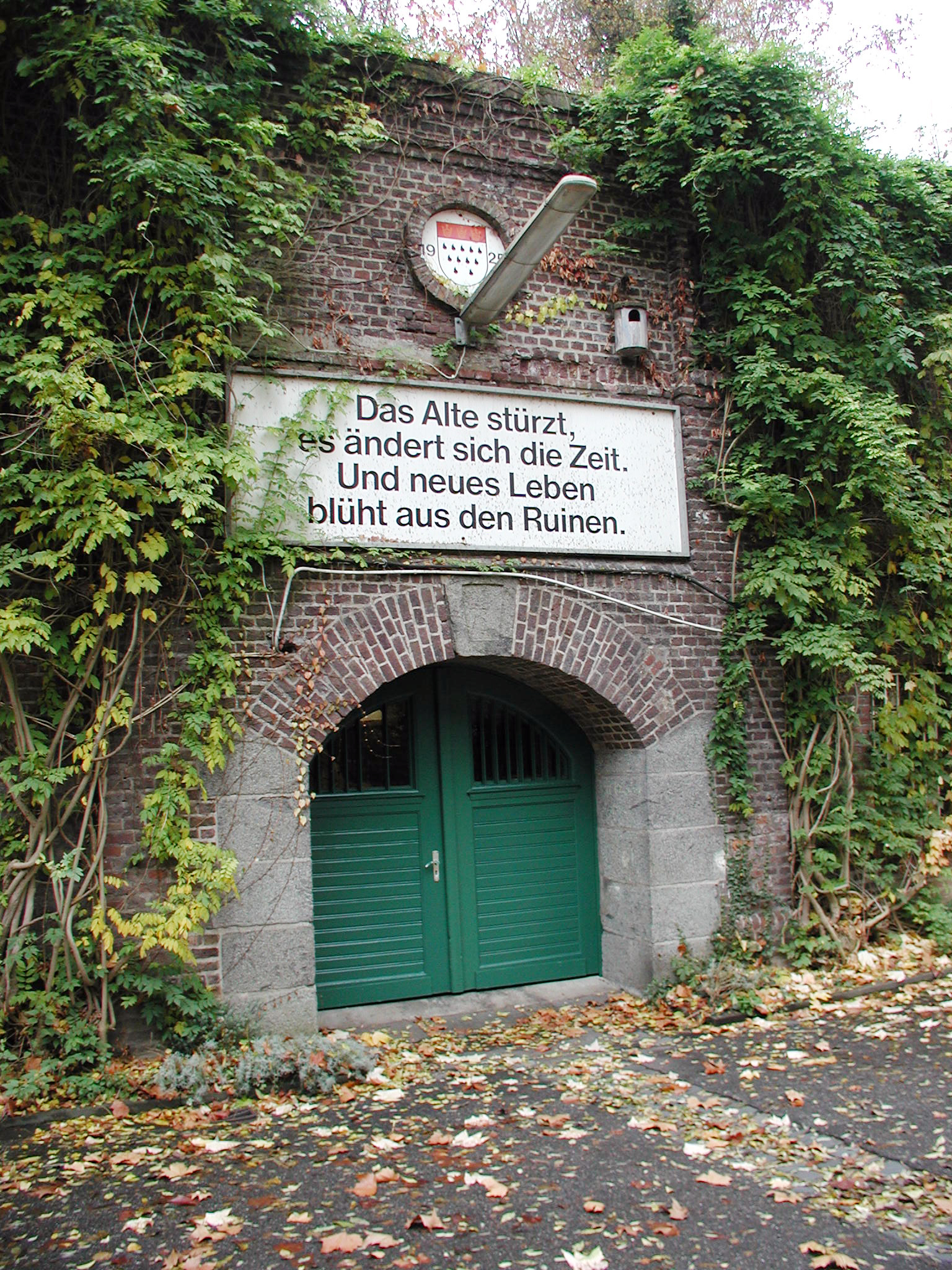
Zwischenwerk V a, a memorial stone on Sportplatz remembers the Nazi victims

After the organized and controlled destruction of lives, properties and establishments in the whole country, the antisemitic policies intensified also in Cologne. Jewish children could not attend any German school. By 1 January 1939 all the Jews were excluded from the economic life and constrained to forced labor. They were expropriated, renters were deprived of rent control.

In total, more than 40% of the Jewish population emigrated before September 1939. In May 1939 the Jewish population was 8,406 with another 2,360 Mischlinge, persons of mixed Jewish-non-Jewish ancestry. When war came in September 1939, the remainder of Cologne Jewry became subject to an all-night curfew, their special food rations were far below that of the general population, they were officially forbidden to use public transport and, when allied bombing began, to use public air raid shelters.

In May 1941 the Cologne Gestapo started to concentrate all Jewish from Cologne in so-called Jewish houses. From there they were transferred to the barracks in Fort V in Müngersdorf. The ghettoisation was the preparation for the deportation to extermination camps. In September 1941 the "Police order about the identification of Jews" obliged all Jewish people in the German Reich more than six years old to wear a yellow badge sewed to the left side of the garment.

=== Deportation from Deutz ===
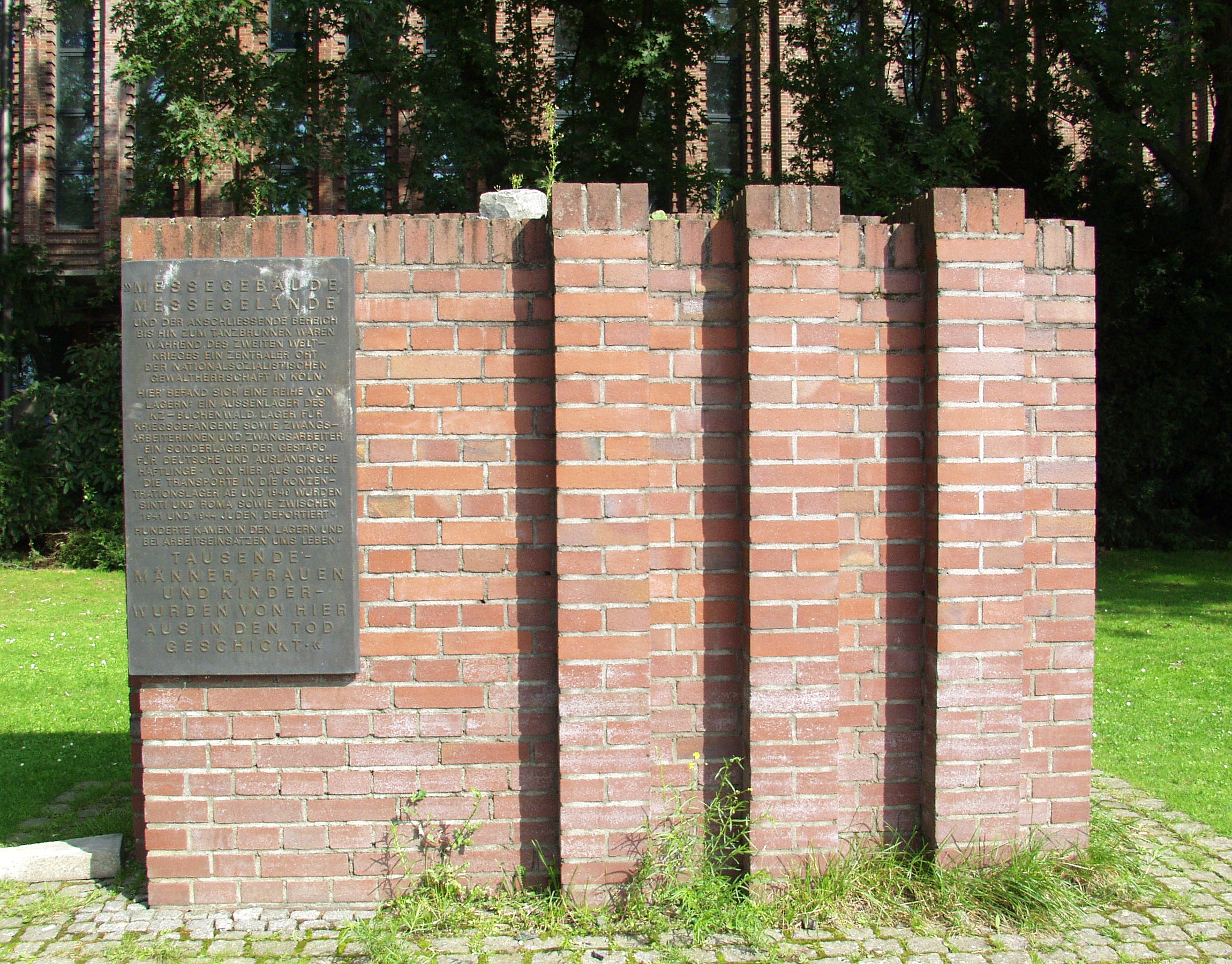
Memorial plaque of the concentration camp in Deutz

On 21 October 1941 the first transport left Cologne for Łódź, the last one was sent to Theresienstadt on 1 October 1944. Immediately before the transport the fair hall in Cologne-Deutz was used as a detention camp. The transports left from the underground part of the Köln Messe/Deutz Station. The deported people went to Łódź, Theresienstadt, Riga, Lublin and other ghettos and camps in the east, which were only transit points: from here they went to extermination camps.

Of special note was the deportation to Minsk on July 20, 1942, of Jewish children and some of their teachers, among them Erich Klibansky. The last to be deported in 1943 were Jewish communal workers. After that deportation the only Jews remaining were those in mixed marriages and their children, many of whom were deported in the fall of 1944.

Out of Müngersdorf and Deutz were situated also prisoners and concentration camps on a factory site in Porz Hochkreuz and also in the nearby place of Brauweiler.

When the U.S. troops occupied Cologne on 6 March 1945, 110 Jewish people who had survived in hiding were found.

== Post-war and present ==
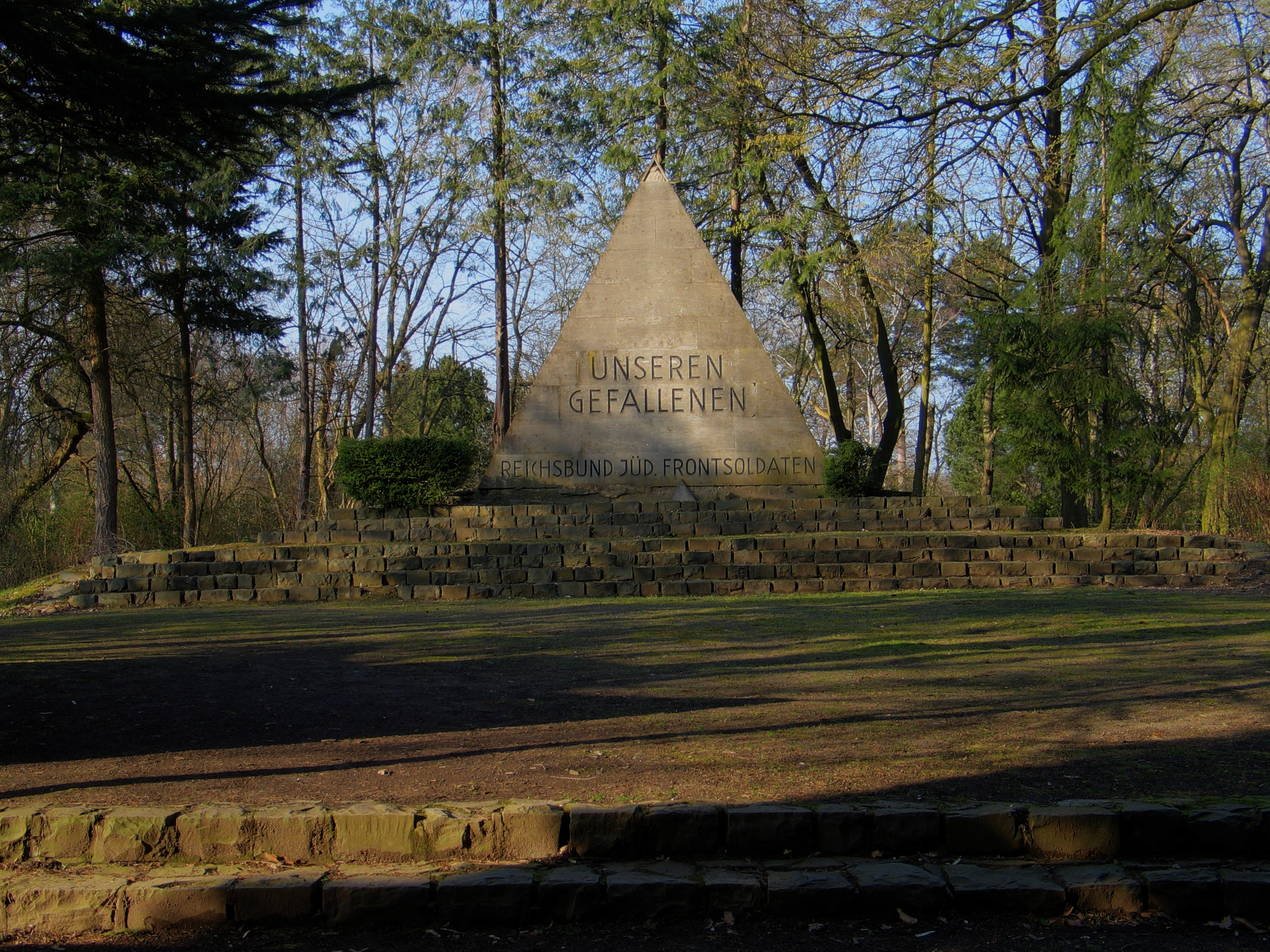
Memorial of the Reichsbund jüdischer Frontsoldaten

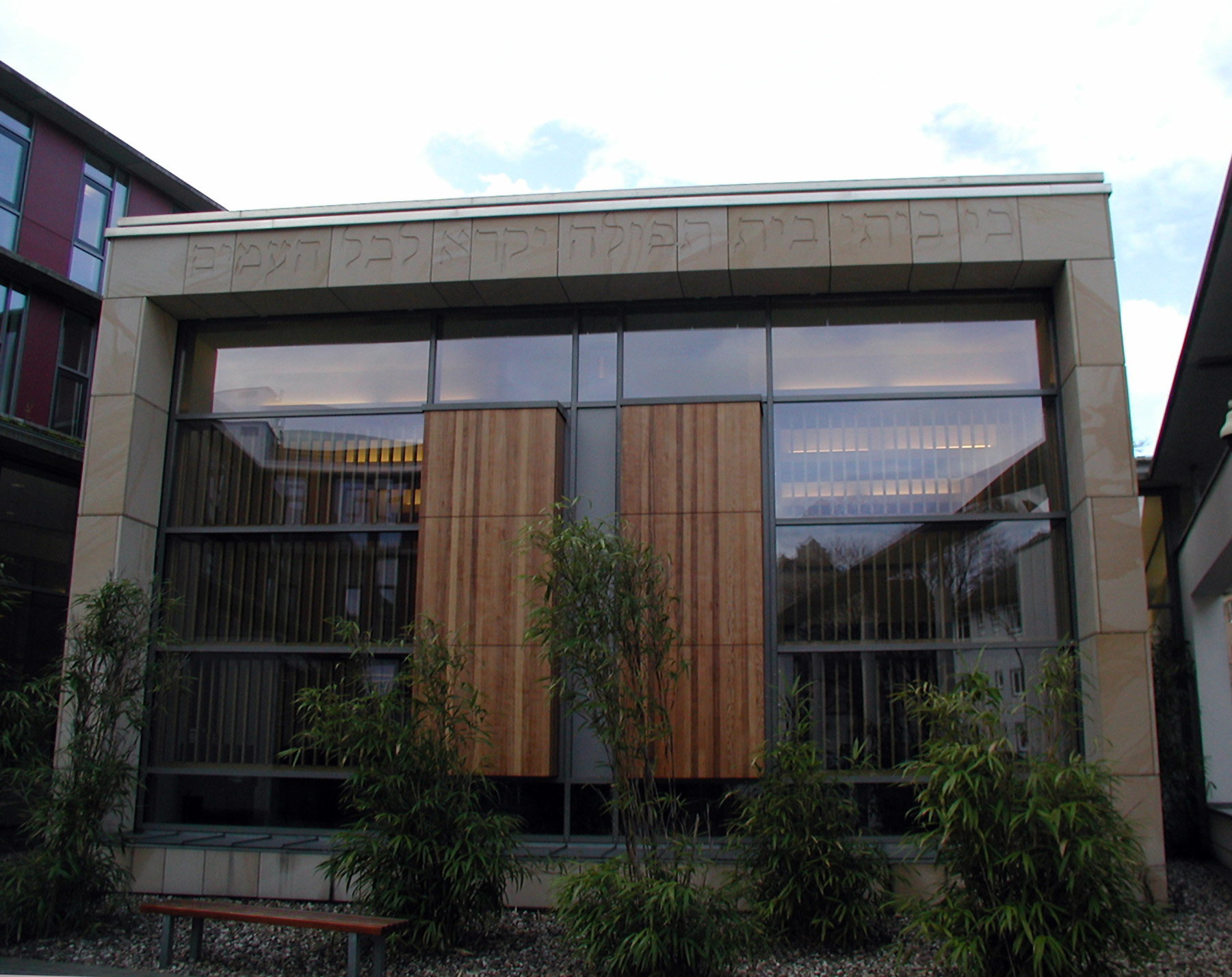
Prayer house of the Ehrenfeld community

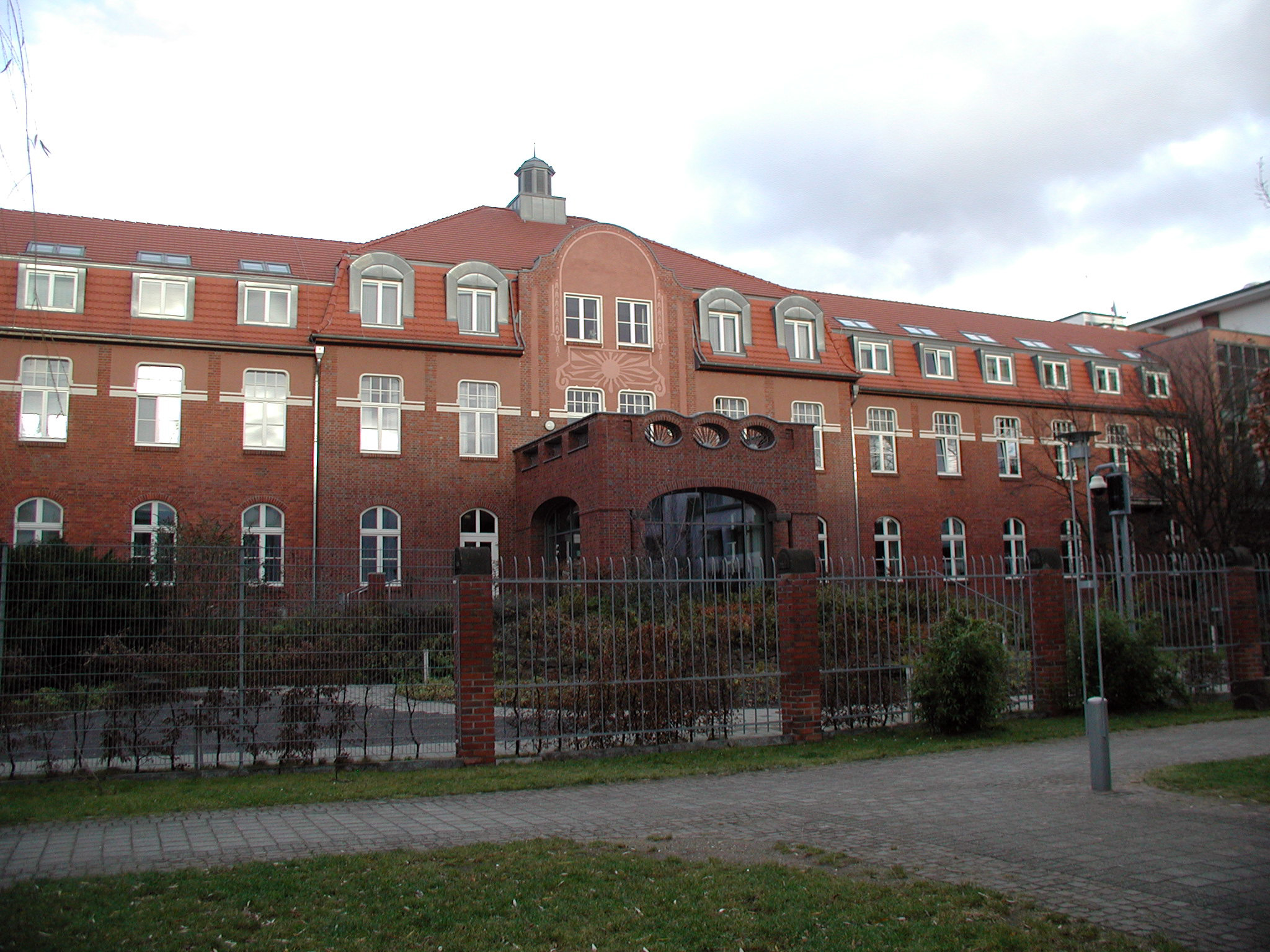
Old building of the Ehrenfeld community

Of the 19,500 Jewish citizens of Cologne in 1930, about 11,000 were killed during the Nazi regime. Some of them were killed after they left Germany to avoid Nazi persecution. Among others, the Cologne lawyer Siegmund Klein and his son Walter Klein were killed in Auschwitz concentration camp, after being deported respectively from the Netherlands and France in 1943 and 1942.

The survivors of the Cologne community regathered in the ruins of the Ehrenfeld asylum, whose main building had been preserved to a large extent, for a new beginning. In Ottostraße a synagogue was also temporarily arranged, until the community could rebuild the Neo-Romanesque Lord's house at Roonstraße in 1959.

At the first post-war Christmas Eve celebrations in 1959, during the Swastika epidemic of 1959–1960, the Roonstrasse Synagogue and the Cologne memorial for the Victims of the Nazi regime were damaged by two members of the extreme rightist Deutsche Reichspartei, who were later arrested. The synagogue was daubed with black, white and red color paint, and a swastika and the slogan "Juden raus" were added.

Rabbis active in Cologne in the postwar period were Zvi Asaria and E. Schereschewski. The Monumenta Judaica exhibition, reflecting 2,000 years of Jewish history and culture in the Rhineland, was shown in 1963–64.

Besides a youth centre, the community maintained a Jewish home for the aged. The Jewish community numbered 1,358 in 1989 and 4,650 in 2003.

=== Jewish cemetery in Bocklemünd ===
The Jewish cemetery of Bocklemünd has been used as a burial place since 1918 and is still used today. The Lapidarium of the cemetery hosts 58 fragments of stones between the 12th and the 15th century, that came from the Jewish cemetery of Judenbüchel in Köln-Raderberg, which was closed in 1695 with the opening of a new cemetery in Deutz and excavated in 1936. People who were buried there were moved to another grave in Bocklemünd.

=== Jewish centre in Nußbaumerstraße ===
The Ehrenfeld Centre on the Nußbaumerstraße / Ottostraße is the successor of the "Jewish Hospital of Ehrenfeld". The hospital survived Nazism but was damaged by bomb attacks. In the building gathered the Jewish survivors of the Cologne community who then moved to the rebuild Synagogue at Roonstraße in the 1950s. Thereafter the hospital served as a Belgian military hospital until the 1990s. The facilities that exist in the same place, today called "Jüdisches Wohlfahrtszentrum", have their origin, as the partly conserved building of the old hospital of 1908, in one of the 18th century charitable constructions in "Silvanstraße", the Israelitische Asyl für Kranke und Altersschwache.

=== Jewish community in Köln-Riehl ===
The Union of Progressive Jews in Germany (UPJ), founded in Munich in June 1997, is a religious association with a small Jewish liberal community in Köln-Riehl, with about 50 members and calls itself Jüdische Liberale Gemeinde Köln Gescher LaMassoret e.V.. The community offers regular religious instruction for small children, young and adults.

=== Notable Cologne Jews in modern times ===
Historical data for the Jewish population of Cologne
Year	Pop.	±%
321		—
801		—
1089	600	—
1349		—
1372	50	—
1424		—
1634	17	—
1789	19	+11.8%
1801	50	+163.2%
1824	500	+900.0%
1849	1,300	+160.0%
1899	9,750	+650.0%
1938	19,500	+100.0%
1949	100	−99.5%
1989	1,350	+1250.0%
2009	4,450	+229.6%
2009 figures by the Central Council of Jews in Germany \

Since 1861, the following persons have headed the executive board of the Jewish community of Cologne: the physician Doctor Bendix, S.M. Frank (until 1879), Jacob de Longe, Louis Elliel (until 1919), Emil Blumenau (until 1931), the lawyer Doctor H. Frank (until 1933) and consul Albert Bendix until 1939.

Until 1857, the community was managed by the Bonn Consistory and its rabbi. The first Cologne rabbi was

- Israel Schwarz (1828–1875), followed by
- Abraham Frank (1839–1917) from 1875,
- Ludwig Rosenthal (1870–1938) from 1897 and from 1906 in charge only of Glockengasse Synagogue,
- Adolf Kober (1879–1958) from 1918 to 1939,
- Isidor Caro (1877–1943) from 1939 to 1942

The synagogues of the community had the following cantors:

- Isaac Offenbach till 1850,
- Rosenberg since 1851,
- F. Blumenthal from 1876 to 1924,
- E. Kohn till 1936,
- F. Fleishmann, Max Baum and Schallamach after 1930.

All of them contributed to the enrichment of synagogue music.

The rectors of the community school were

- Bernhard Coblenz from 1901 to 1926, and
- Emil Kahn from 1926 to 1938.

Cologne Jews, involved in the larger Jewish community were

- Salomon Oppenheim, Jr.'s sons Abraham and Simon, and
- the founders of Zionism:
  - Max Bodenheimer,
  - David Wolffsohn and
  - Nahum Sokolow.

The most important Jewish names in the economic life of the city during the nineteenth century were

- the brothers Abraham Oppenheim (1804–1878) and
- Simon Oppenheim (1803–1880), active in banking and railroads;
- the brothers Jacob, Loeb and Louis Eltzbacher active in banking; and
- Adolf Silverberg and his son involved in peat-coal.

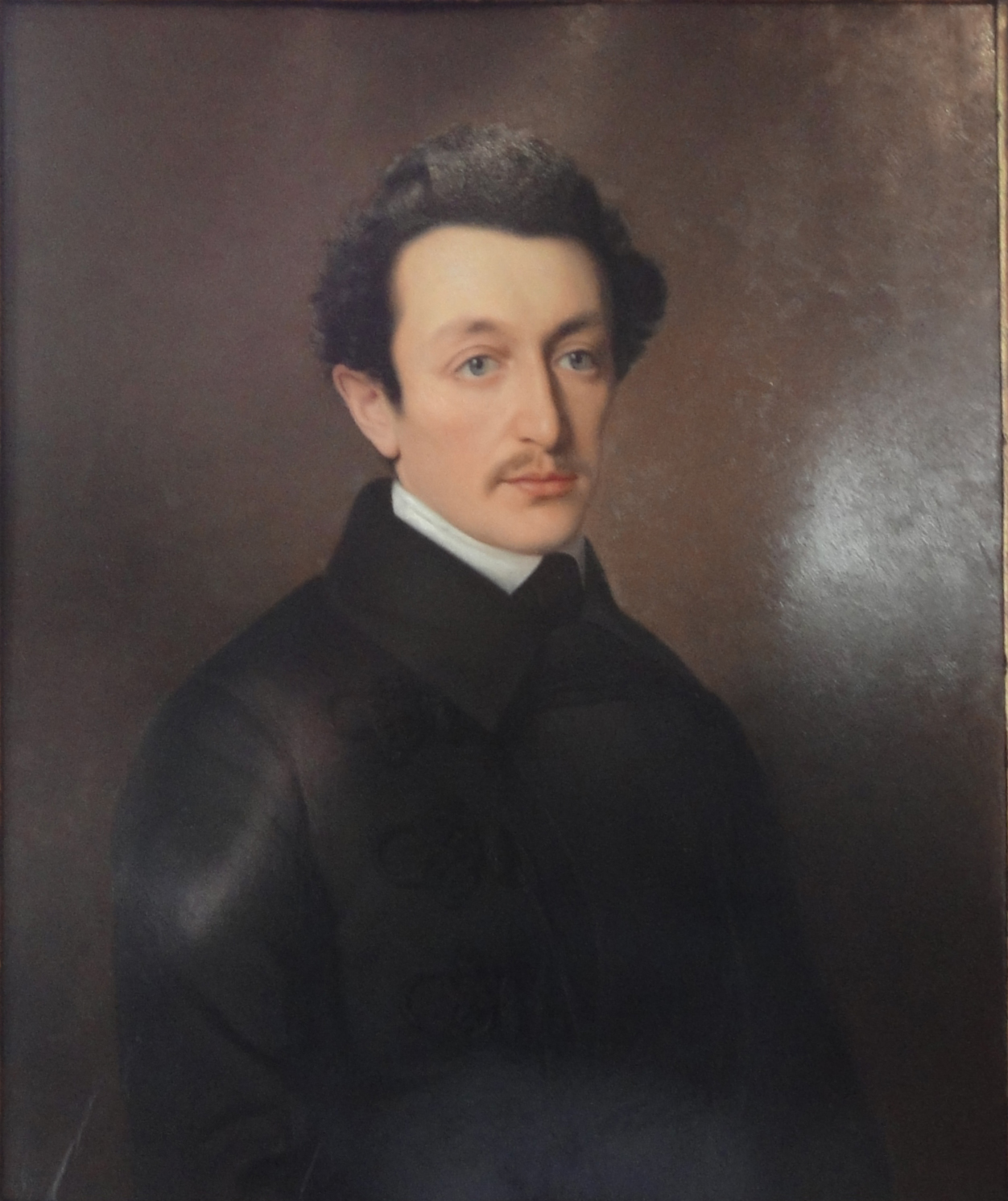
Moses Hess, Zeughaus Köln

Jews involved in politics were

- Moses Hess (as mentioned above);
- the physician Andreas Gottschalk, founder of the Workers' Club in Cologne; and
- Bernhard Falck, member of the National Assembly from 1919.

Jews involved in the arts were

- the lithographer and painter David Levi Elkan (1808–1865),
- the cantor Isaac Judah Offenbach and his son, the composer Jacques Offenbach, born in Cologne in 1819,
- the conductor Ferdinand Hiller (1811–1885), kapellmeister in Cologne from 1849 to 1884,
- the composer Friedrich Gersheim who taught at the Cologne Conservatory from 1865 to 1874.

During the 1930s Cologne had many Jewish lawyers (125 at number) and doctors.

== Memorial sites ==
- In the church of St. Maria vom Frieden of the Cologne Carmeliten a small archive in the monastery attached to the church keeps the memory of the fellow nun who was killed 9 August 1942 in Auschwitz concentration camp, the Jewish Edith Stein who converted to the catholic religion.
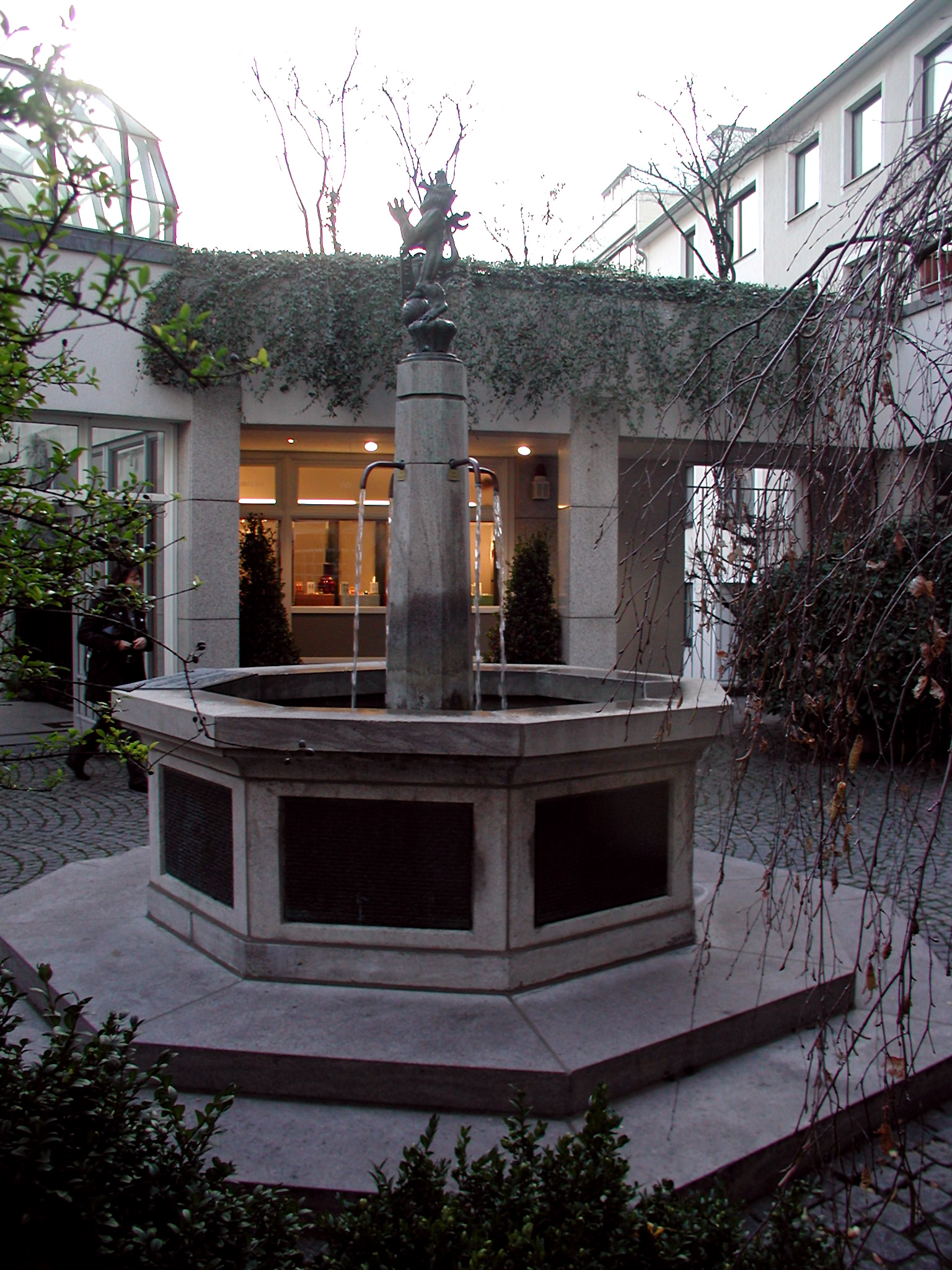
Löwenbrunnen in Klibanskiplatz

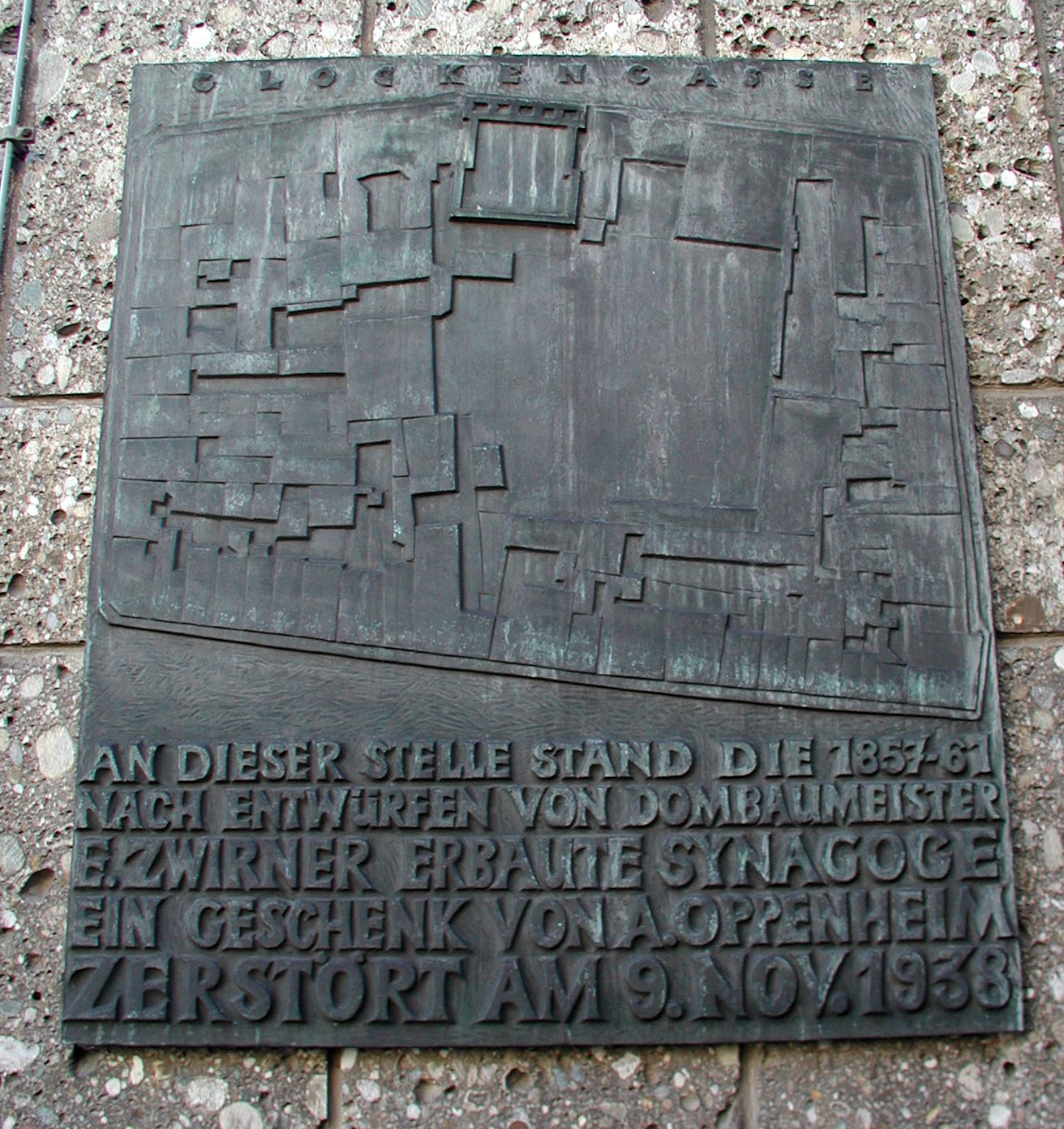
Memorial plaque for the synagogue in Glockengasse

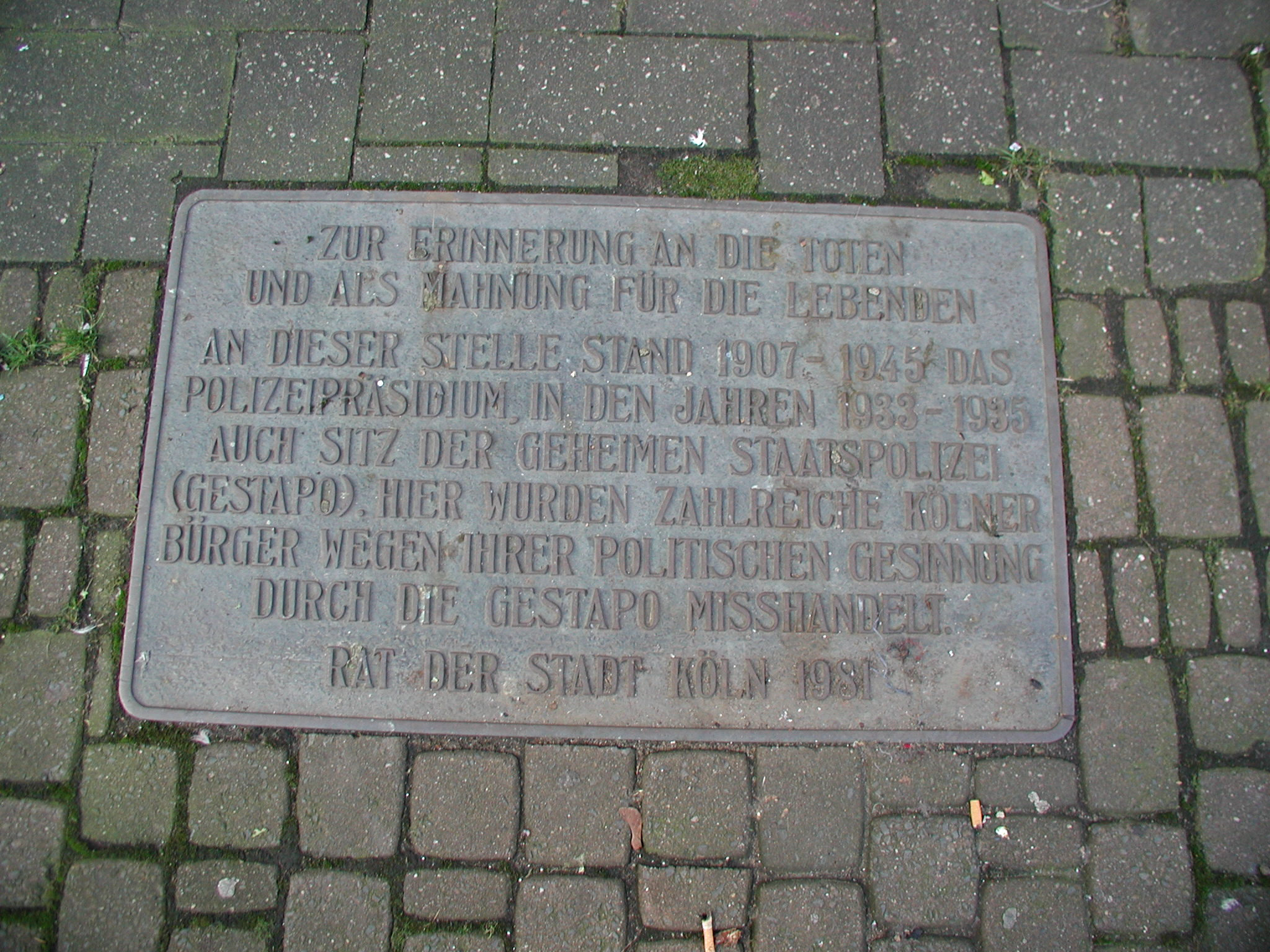
Police building in Schildergasse, seat of Gestapo 1933/35

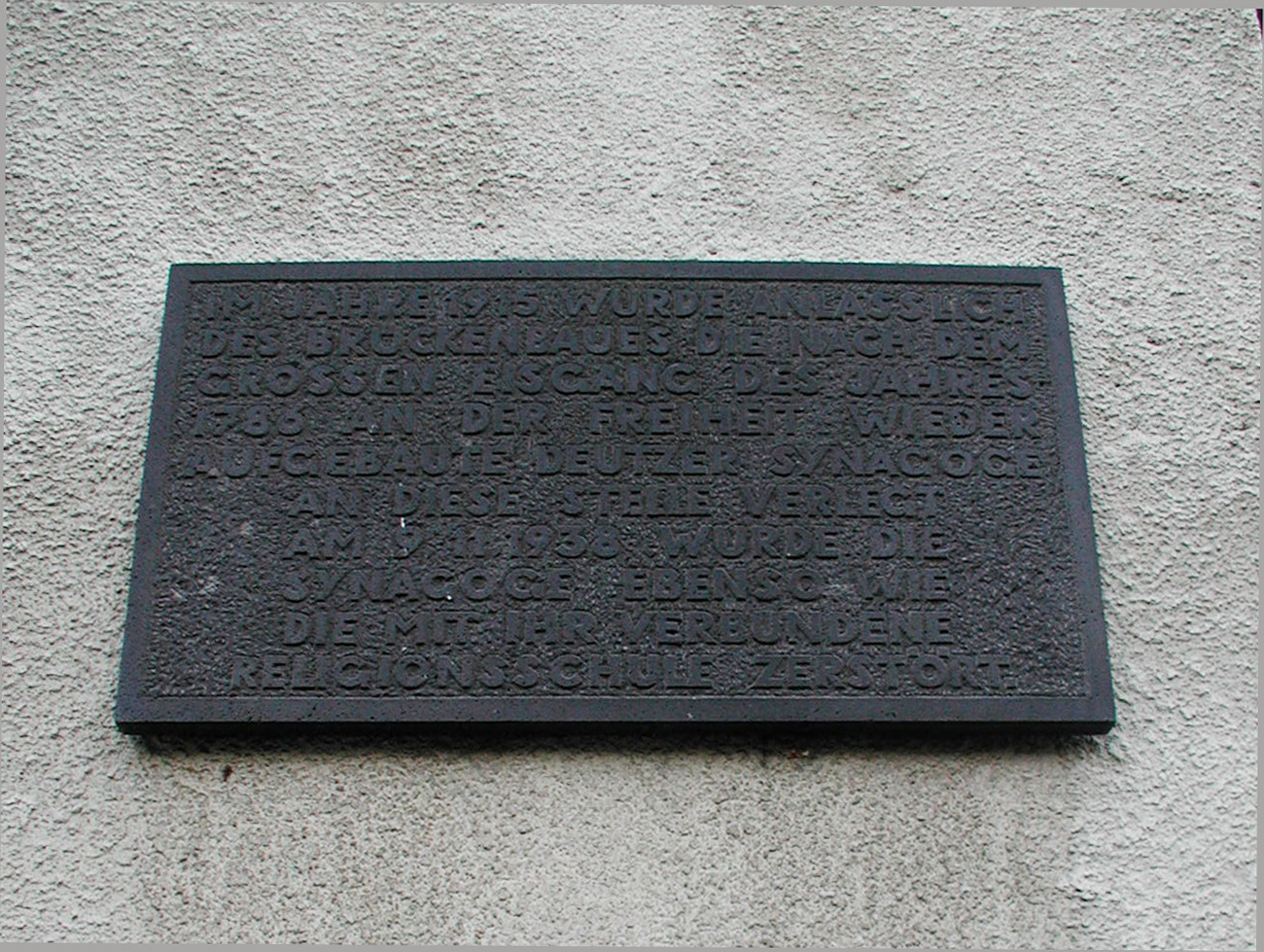
Memorial plaque in Reischplatz 6

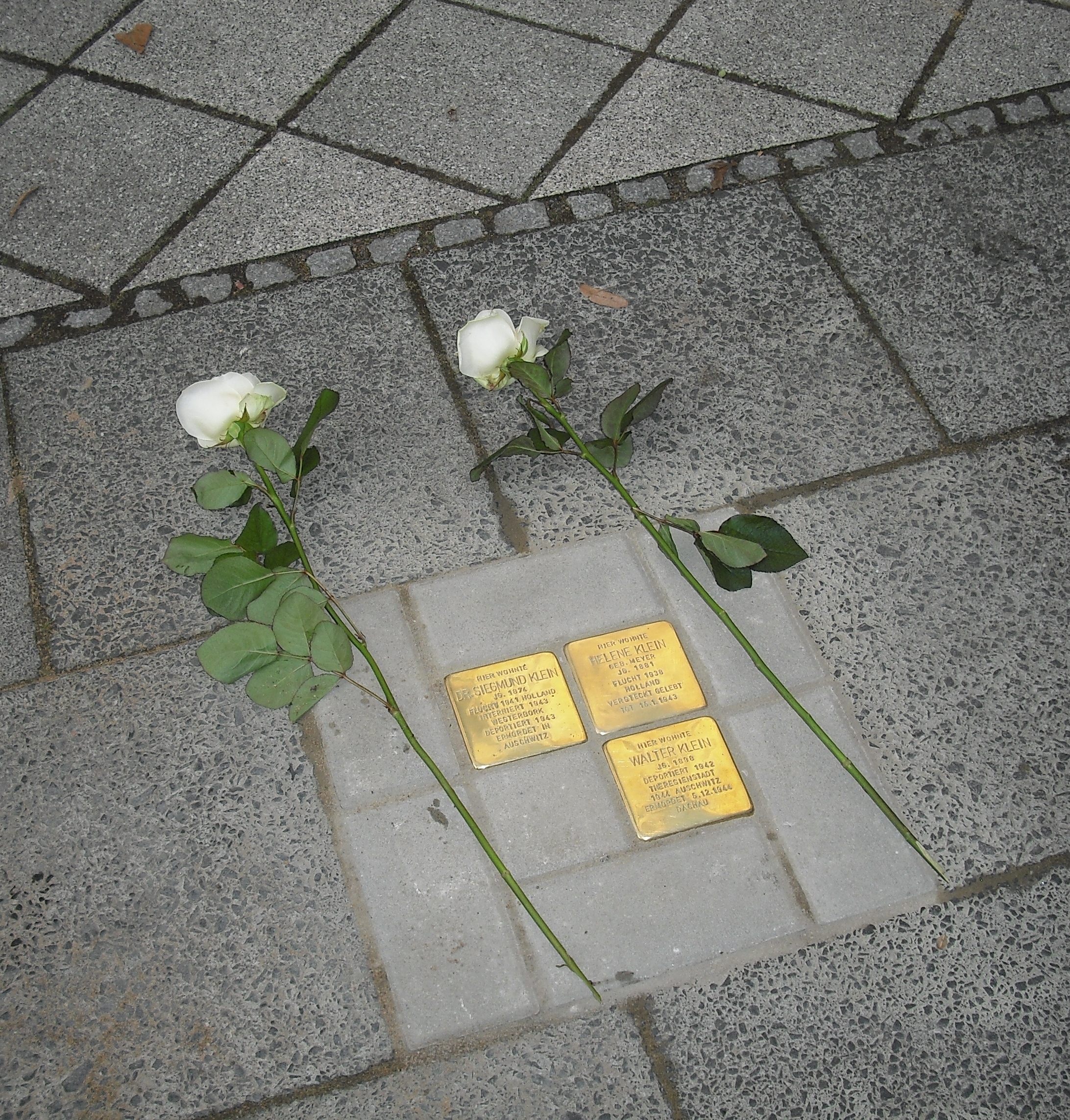
Stolpersteine in front of Blumenthalstrasse 23 in remembrance of Siegmund, Helene und Walter Klein
- In the Jewish cemetery in Köln-Bocklemünd two memorials remember the Jewish victims. One memorial keeps the memory of the members of the Cologne synagogue community who died in Theresienstadt with the acting rabbi until 1942 Isidor Caro (born in Znin-Poland 16.10.1877-deported to Theresienstadt 16.6.1942-deported to Auschwitz 28.8.1943). A street has been named after rabbi Caro in Köln-Stammheim. A second memorial plaque keeps the memory of all the victims of the Synagogue community of Cologne.
- The memorial "Die Gefangenen", 1943, created by Ossip Zadkine, stays on the honor monument of the Westfriedhof, Köln-Bocklemünd
- Memorial plaque in Ehrenfeld, Körnerstraße
- A bronze plaque remembers the Synagogue in Glockengasse near today's Opera House
- A memorial plaque in St. Apern-Straße/ corner with Helenenstraße (on the side of the hotel) is dedicated to the Synagogue of St. Apern-Straße. In front of the hotel building on the small Erich Klibansky Platz you can see the Löwenbrunnen (1997)
- Memorial plaque for the victims of Gestapo in Krebsgasse
- Memorial plaque in Reischplatz 6 in Deutz for the last of the three Deutz synagogues (Haus der Polizeistation)
- Memorial plaque on Messeturm Köln, Kennedy-Ufer
- Memorial plaque at Stadtpark, Walter-Binder-Weg
- Stolpersteine of the artist Gunter Demnig in front of the houses where victims of the Nazis lived assures the remembrance of these Jews.

The Judengasse, near the Rathaus, reminds of the former Jewish quarter. During French annexion of Cologne, the Judengasse was given the name "Rue des Juifs", but renamed to its old name shortly after. Today, this area has no residential buildings.

== Cologne Jewish Museum ==
The municipality of Cologne, in the frame of the Regionale 2010, plans to build an "archeological area" as an archaeological-historical museum. In this context a Jewish museum should arise between the historical Rathaus and the Wallraf-Richartz-Museum over the basement of the first Cologne synagogues and ritual bath. The construction has been decided in the Council but is opposed by politics and the people, because the town loses a free square in front of the historical Rathaus. At present there are excavations on the designated site for the first time since 1950, in which part of the synagogue of the Jewish quarter should be uncovered.

== See also ==
- History of the Jews in Germany
- History of the Jews in Hamburg
- History of the Jews in Munich
- History of Cologne
- Yiddish language

== Sources ==
- Britta Bopf, (2004). "Arisierung" in Köln : die wirtschaftliche Existenzvernichtung der Juden 1933-1945. Emons. OCLC 607260058.
- Zvi Asaria: Die Juden in Köln, von den ältesten Zeiten bis zur Gegenwart, J. P. Bachem, 1959.
- Zvi Avneri: Germania Judaica. Bd. 2: Von 1238 bis zur Mitte des 14. Jahrhunderts, Tübingen 1968.
- Barbara Becker-Jákli: Das Jüdische Köln. Geschichte und Gegenwart. Ein Stadtführer, Emons Verlag Köln, Köln 2012, ISBN 978-3-89705-873-6.
- Barbara Becker-Jákli: Das jüdische Krankenhaus in Köln; die Geschichte des Israelitischen Asyls für Kranke und Altersschwache 1869–1945, 2004. ISBN 3-89705-350-0 (mit Ergänzungen zum Nachbau)
- Johannes Ralf Beines: "Die alte Synagoge in Deutz", in Rechtsrheinisches Köln, Jahrbuch für Geschichte und Landeskunde. Geschichts- und Heimatverein Rechtsrheinisches Köln e. V. Band 14. ISSN 0179-2938
- Michael Berger: Eisernes Kreuz und Davidstern. Die Geschichte Jüdischer Soldaten in Deutschen Armeen, trafo Verlag, 2006. ISBN 3-89626-476-1
- Anna-Dorothee von den Brincken: "Privilegien Karls IV. für die Stadt Köln", in: Blätter für deutsche Landesgeschichte 114. 1978, p. 243–264.
- Michael Brocke/Christiane Müller: Haus des Lebens. Jüdische Friedhöfe in Deutschland. Verlag Reclam, Leipzig 2001. ISBN 978-3-379-00777-1
- Isaac Broydé: "Cologne" in Jewish Encyclopedia, 1902
- Alexander Carlebach, "Cologne" in Jewish Encyclopedia, The Gale Group, 2008
- Carl Dietmar: Die Chronik Kölns, Chronik Verlag, Dortmund 1991. ISBN 3-611-00193-7
- Werner Eck: Köln in römischer Zeit. Geschichte einer Stadt im Rahmen des Imperium Romanum. H. Stehkämper (Hrsg.), Geschichte der Stadt Köln in 13 Bänden, Bd. 1. Köln 2004, S. 325ff. ISBN 3-7743-0357-6.
- Liesel Franzheim: Juden in Köln von der Römerzeit bis ins 20. Jahrhundert. Köln 1984.
- Marianne Gechter, Sven Schütte: "Ursprung und Voraussetzungen des mittelalterlichen Rathauses und seiner Umgebung", in: Walter Geis und Ulrich Krings (Hrsg.): Köln: Das gotische Rathaus und seine historische Umgebung. Köln 2000 (Stadtspuren - Denkmäler in Köln; 26), p. 69–196.
- Frantisek Graus: Pest-Geißler-Judenmorde. Das 14. Jahrhundert als Krisenzeit. Göttingen 1988.
- Monika Grübel: Seit 321 Juden in Köln, Kurzführer, Köln 2005. extract
- Monika Grübel und Georg Mölich: Jüdisches Leben im Rheinland. Vom Mittelalter bis zur Gegenwart. ISBN 3-412-11205-4.
- Alfred Haverkamp: Zur Geschichte der Juden im Deutschland des späten Mittelalters und der frühen Neuzeit. Stuttgart 1981.
- Alfred Haverkamp: Die Judenverfolgungen zur Zeit des Schwarzen Todes im Gesellschaftsgefüge deutscher Städte. in: Monographien zur Geschichte des Mittelalters 24. 1981, p. 27–93.
- Wilhelm Janssen: Die Regesten der Erzbischöfe von Köln im Mittelalter, Bonn/Köln 1973.
- Adolf Kober: Cologne, The Jewish Publication Society of America, Philadelphia 1940 (available online).
- Shulamit S. Magnus: Jewish Emancipation in a German City: Cologne, 1798–1871 , Stanford University Press, 1997. ISBN 0-8047-2644-2
- Kirsten Serup-Bilfeldt: Zwischen Dom und Davidstern. Jüdisches Leben in Köln. Verlag Kiepenheuer & Witsch, Köln. ISBN 3-462-03508-8
- Gerd Mentgen: "Die Ritualmordaffäre um den 'Guten Werner' von Oberwesel und ihre Folgen", in: Jahrbuch für westdeutsche Landesgeschichte 21. 1995, p. 159–198.
- Klaus Militzer: Ursachen und Folgen der innerstädtischen Auseinandersetzungen in Köln in der zweiten Hälfte des 14. Jahrhunderts. Köln 1980 (Veröffentlichungen des Kölner Geschichtsvereins, 36).
- Alexander Patschovsky: "Feindbilder der Kirche: Juden und Ketzer im Vergleich (11. - 13. Jahrhundert)", in: Alfred Haverkamp (Hrsg.): Juden und Christen zur Zeit der Kreuzzüge. Sigmaringen 1999, p. 327–357.
- Elfi Pracht-Jörns: Jüdisches Kulturerbe in Nordrhein-Westfalen, Teil 1: Regierungsbezirk Köln, Köln 1997
- Robert Wilhelm Rosellen: Geschichte der Pfarreien des Dekanates Brühl. J. P. Bachem, Köln 1887
- Matthias Schmandt: Judei, cives et incole: Studien zur jüdischen Geschichte Kölns im Mittelalter. Forschungen zur Geschichte der Juden Bd. 11. Hanover 2002. ISBN 3-7752-5620-2
- Kurt Schubert: Jüdische Geschichte. München 2007.
- Sven Schütte: Der Almemor der Kölner Synagoge um 1270/80 - Gotische Kleinarchitektur aus der Kölner Dombauhütte. Befunde Rekonstruktion und Umfeld. in: Colonia Romanica. Jahrbuch des Fördervereins Romanische Kirchen in Köln XIII. 1998, p. 188-215.
- Arnold Stelzmann: Illustrierte Geschichte der Stadt Köln. Verlag Bachem, Köln 1958. Verlagsnummer 234758
- M. Toch: Siedlungsstruktur der Juden Mitteleuropas im Wandel vom Mittelalter zur Neuzeit. in: Alfred Haverkamp u. Ziwes, (Hrsg.): Juden in der christlichen Umwelt während des späten Mittelalters. Berlin 1992, p. 29–39.
- Markus J. Wenniger: Zum Verhältnis der Kölner Juden zu ihrer Umwelt im Mittelalter. In: Jutta Bohnke-Kollwitz, Paul Eckert Willehad, u.a. (Hrsg.): Köln und das rheinische Judentum. Festschrift Germania Judaica 1959–1984, Köln 1984 p. 17–34.
- Adam Wrede: Neuer Kölnischer Sprachschatz. 3 Bände A – Z, Greven Verlag, Köln, 9. Auflage 1984. ISBN 3-7743-0155-7
- Franz-Josef Ziwes: Studien zur Geschichte der Juden im mittleren Rheingebiet während des hohen und späten Mittelalters. Hannover 1995. ISBN 3-7752-5610-5
