= Swastika (disambiguation) =

Swastika is a symbol with an equilateral cross, with four (or a multiple of four) arms bent at 90 degrees.

Swastika or Swastik may also refer to:

== Arts and entertainment ==
- Manji (film), a 1964 Japanese film formally titled 卍 and translated as Swastika
- Swastika (film), a British documentary film by Philippe Mora
- Swastik Productions, Indian television and film production company
- Swastik Rangoli Kalakar Group, Indian art collective

== People ==
=== Given name ===
- Swastik Samal (born 2000), Indian cricketer
- Swastika Dutta (born 1994), Indian actress
- Swastika Mukherjee (born 1980), Indian actress

=== Surname ===
- Alia Swastika (born 1980), Jakarta-based curator and writer

== Places ==
=== United States ===
- Brilliant, New Mexico, an unincorporated community formerly named Swastika
- Fish Lake, Minnesota, an unincorporated community formerly named Swastika Beach
- Swastika, New York, an unincorporated community
- Swastika Lake, Wyoming
- Swastika Mountain, Oregon

=== Elsewhere ===
- Swastika, Ontario, a community in Kirkland Lake, Ontario, Canada
  - Swastika railway station, railway station in Canada
- Swastika Trail, a controversial street name in Puslinch, Ontario
- Swastika Stone, a stone with a swastika in West Yorkshire, England
- Swastik High School, Ahmedabad, Gujarat, India

== Sports teams ==
- Cañon City Swastikas, a member of the short-lived minor league baseball Rocky Mountain League in 1912
- Fernie Swastikas, a Canadian women's ice hockey team in Fernie, British Columbia, from 1922 to 1926
- Windsor Swastikas, a Canadian men's ice hockey team in Windsor, Nova Scotia, from 1905 to 1916

== Other uses ==
- Swastika (Germanic Iron Age), a Germanic pagan symbol
- Swastika epidemic of 1959–1960, a wave of anti-Jewish incidents that happened at the end of 1959 to 1960
- Swastika Laundry, a former laundry in Ireland

== See also ==
- Swasika (born 1992), Indian film actress
- Swastika Eyes, a song by the Scottish rock band Primal Scream
- Swastika Night, a novel by British writer Katharine Burdekin
- Swastik Sanket, 2022 Indian historical fiction film by Sayantan Ghosal about Subhas Chandra Bose and Nazi Germany
- Red Swastik, 2007 Indian erotic thriller film by Vinod Pande
- Western use of the swastika in the early 20th century
- Zwastika
