= Rangoli (disambiguation) =

Rangoli is a type of Indian folk art.

Rangoli may also refer to:

- Rangoli (TV series), an Indian music television series
- Rungoli (also transliterated as Rangoli), a 1962 Hindi comedy film
- Rangoli Restaurant, an Indian cuisine restaurant started by Vikram Vij
- "Rangoli", an episode of the television series Teletubbies

== See also ==
- "Rangoli Rangoli", a song by Thaman S, Sonu Kakkar and Divya Kumar from the 2013 Indian film Baadshah
- Rangoli Metro Art Center
- Swastik Rangoli Kalakar Group, a Vadodara-based art group
