= Kolam =

South Indian form of drawing on the ground using rice flour

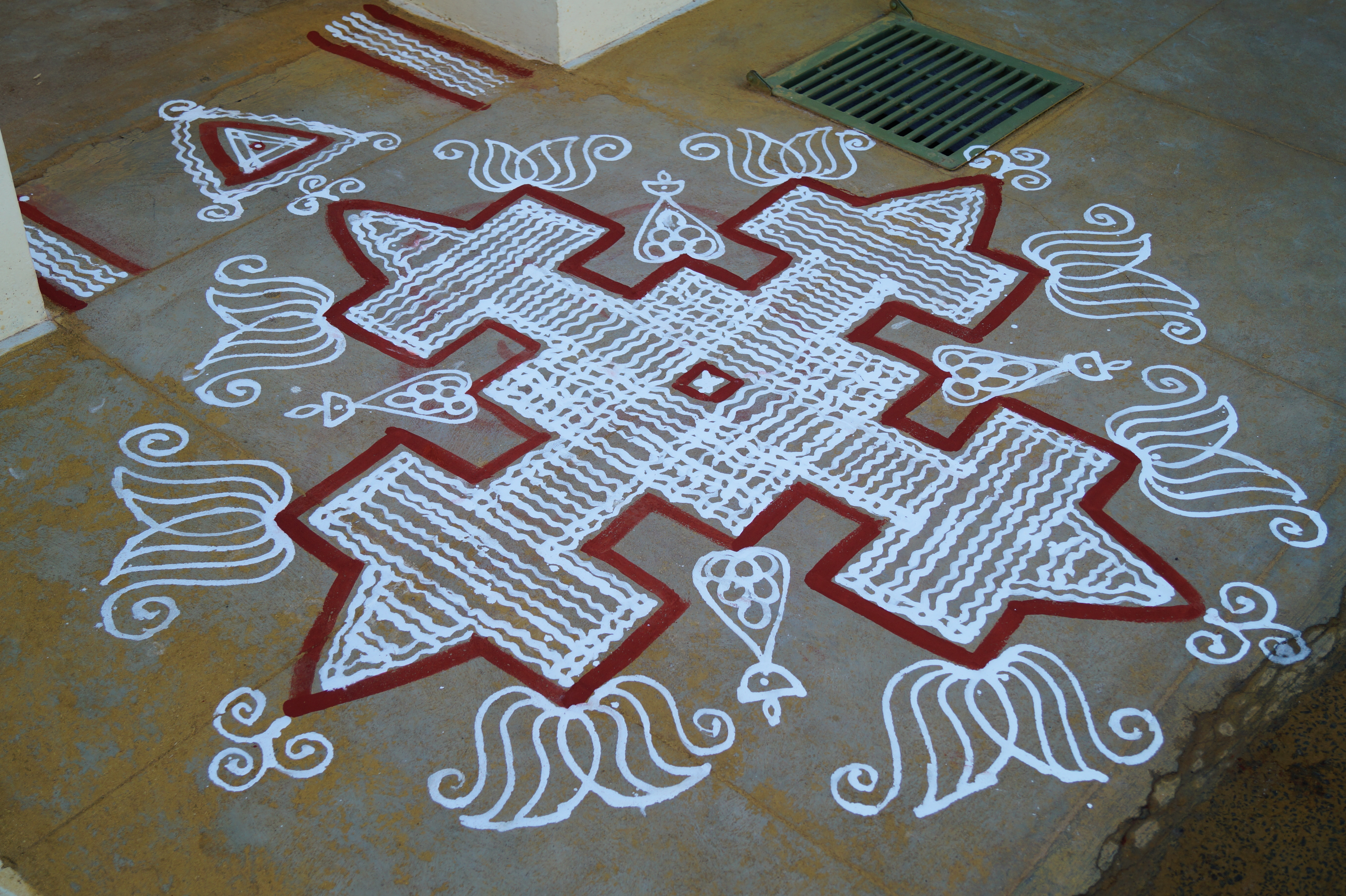
Traditional kolam made with rice flour and kaavi borders for a house function at Tamil Nadu, India

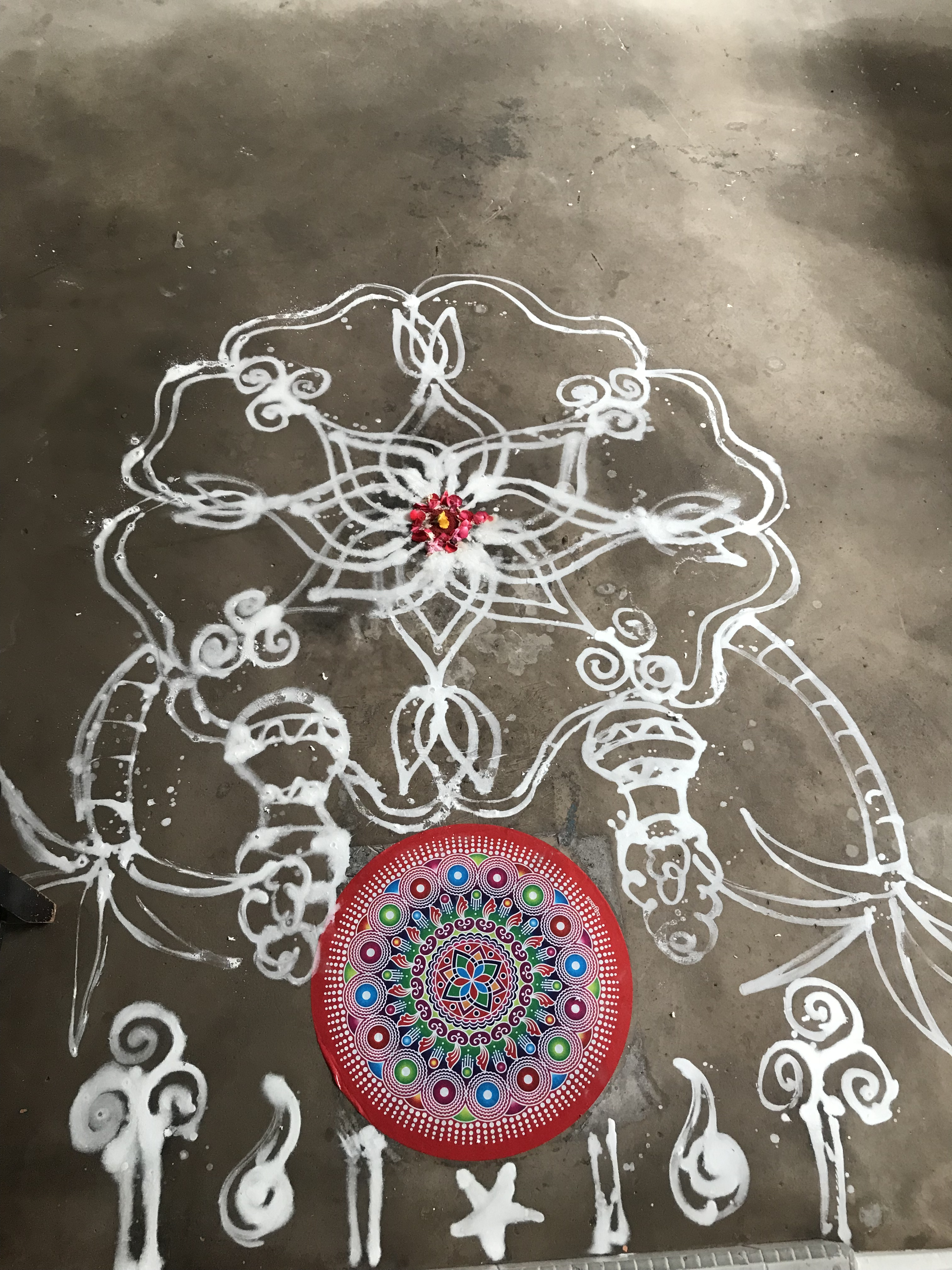
Traditional Agrahara kolam made with soaked rice flour or coloured rice for the festival of Thai Pongal, taken from a house in Singapore

Kolam (Tamil: கோலம், Malayalam: കോലം), also known as Muggu (Telugu: ముగ్గు), Tarai Alangaram (Tamil: தரை அலங்காரம்) and Rangole (Kannada: ರಂಗೋಲೆ), is a form of traditional decorative art that is drawn by using rice flour as per age-old conventions. It is also drawn using white stone powder, chalk or chalk powder, often along with natural or synthetic color powders. It is a part of the South Indian culture and found across all South Indian States. It can be found in some parts of Goa and Maharashtra. Since the South Indian diaspora is worldwide, the practice of kolam is found around the world, including in Sri Lanka, Singapore, Malaysia, Indonesia, Thailand and a few other Asian countries. A kolam or muggu is a geometrical line drawing composed of straight lines, curves and loops, drawn around a grid pattern of dots. It is widely practised by female family members in front of their house entrance, although men and boys also practice this tradition. The similar regional versions of kolam with their own distinctive forms are known by different names in India: raangolee in Maharashtra, aripan in Mithila, alpona in West Bengal and hase and rangole in Kannada in Karnataka. More complex kolams are drawn and colors are often added during festival days, holiday occasions and special events.. Although kolam is sometimes referred to as a type of rangoli, the two terms refer to related but distinct traditions of Indian floor art: kolam typically denotes the daily geometric and symmetrical rice-flour line drawings practiced across South India, and is usually monochrome or lightly colored, whereas rangoli is a broader pan-Indian term for colourful floor and entrance patterns created on special occasions and festivals, with more emphasis on vibrant coloured powders and motifs.

== Practice and belief ==
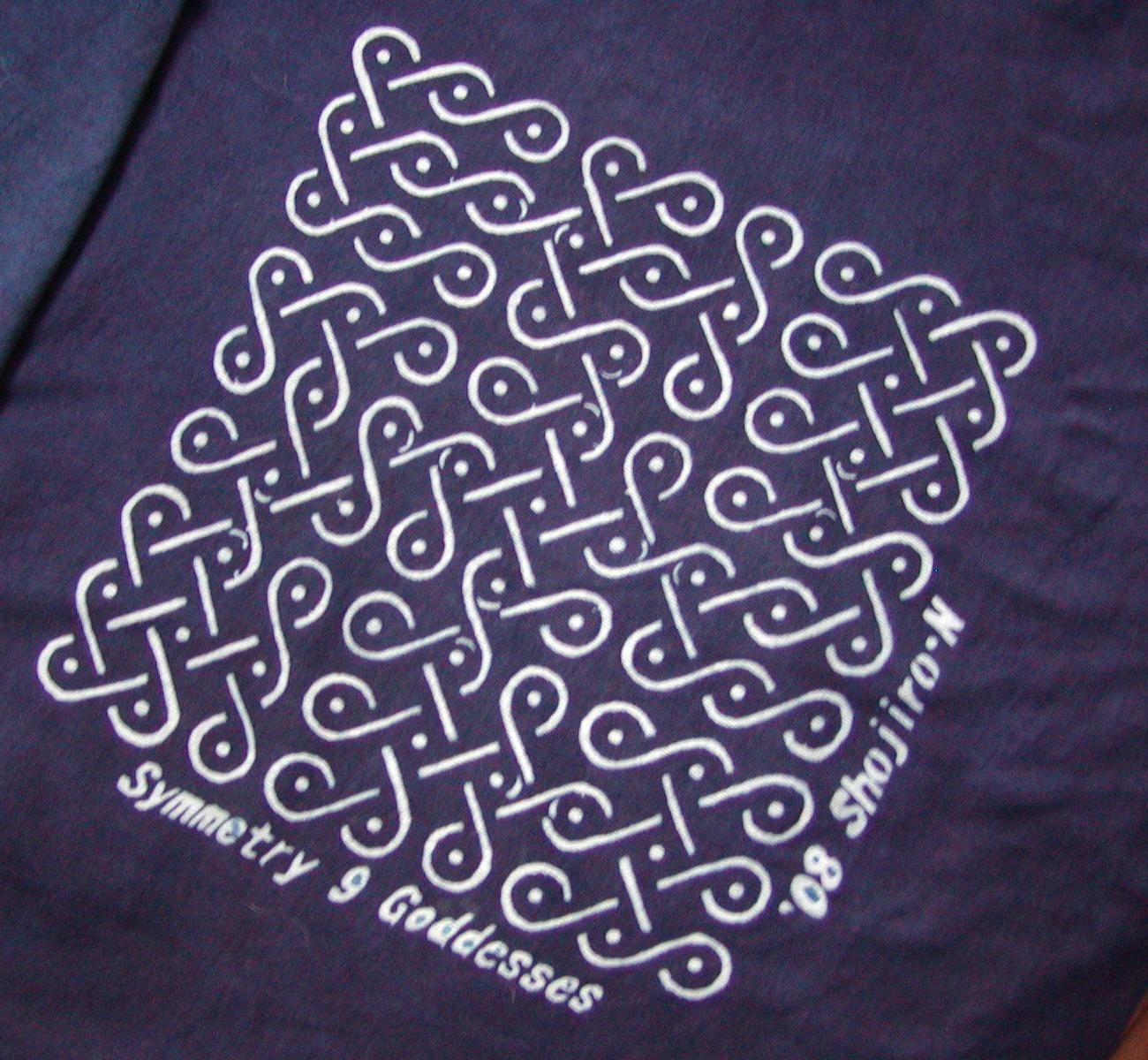
3x3 symmetry 9 goddesses swastika kolam with a single cycle by Nagata S, each of which corresponds to one of the nine Devi (goddesses) of the Vedic system

Kolams or muggulu are thought to bring prosperity to homes. In millions of households in Tamil Nadu, Telangana and Andhra Pradesh, women draw kolams in front of their home entrance every day at the break of dawn. Traditionally kolams are drawn on the flat surface of the ground with white rice flour. The drawings get walked on throughout the day, washed out in the rain, or blown around in the wind; new ones are made the next day. Each morning before sunrise, the front entrance of the house, or wherever the kolam may be drawn, is swept clean, sprinkled with water, thereby making for a flat surface. The kolams are generally drawn while the surface is still damp so the design will hold better. Instead of rice flour (Tamil: கோலமாவு/Telugu: బియ్యం పిండి), white stone powder is occasionally used for creating Kolam; cow dung is also used to wax the floors. In some cultures, cow dung is believed to have antiseptic properties and hence provides a literal threshold of protection for the home. It also provides contrast with the white powder.

Decoration is not the main purpose of a kolam. In the olden days, kolams or muggulu were drawn in coarse rice flour so the ants would not have to walk too far or too long for a meal. The rice powder also invites birds and other small creatures to eat it. It is a sign of invitation to welcome all into the home, not the least of whom is Lakshmi, the goddess of prosperity and wealth. The patterns range from geometric and mathematical line drawings around a matrix of dots to free-form artwork and closed shapes. Folklore has evolved to mandate that the lines must be completed to symbolically prevent evil spirits from entering the inside of the shapes. Thus, they are prevented from entering the inside of the home.

It used to be a matter of pride to be able to draw large complicated patterns without lifting the hand off the floor or standing up in between. The month of Mārgaḻi/Margasira was eagerly awaited by young women, who would then showcase their skills by covering the entire width of the road with one big kolam.

In the kolam patterns, many designs are derived from magical motifs and abstract designs blended with philosophical and religious motifs which have been mingled together. Motifs may include fish, birds, and other animal images to symbolise the unity of man and beast. The sun, moon and other zodiac symbols are also used. A downward-pointing triangle represents woman; an upward-pointing triangle represents man. A circle represents nature while a square represents culture. A lotus represents the womb. A pentagram represents Venus and the five elements.

The ritual kolam patterns created for special occasions such as weddings often stretch down the street. Many of these created patterns have been passed on from generation to generation, from mothers to daughters.

Text messages like the word welcome (Tamil: நல்வரவு/స్వాగతం) or a seasonal phrase, happy new year, can also be used in kolam/muggu. Volunteering to draw the kolam at the temple is sometimes done when a devotee's wishes are fulfilled. The art of kolam designs has found its way into the future through social networking sites like Facebook. Many kolam/muggu artists have large fan followings online and are playing a role in making the kolam art form a key part of South India's contemporary art scene.

== Variants ==
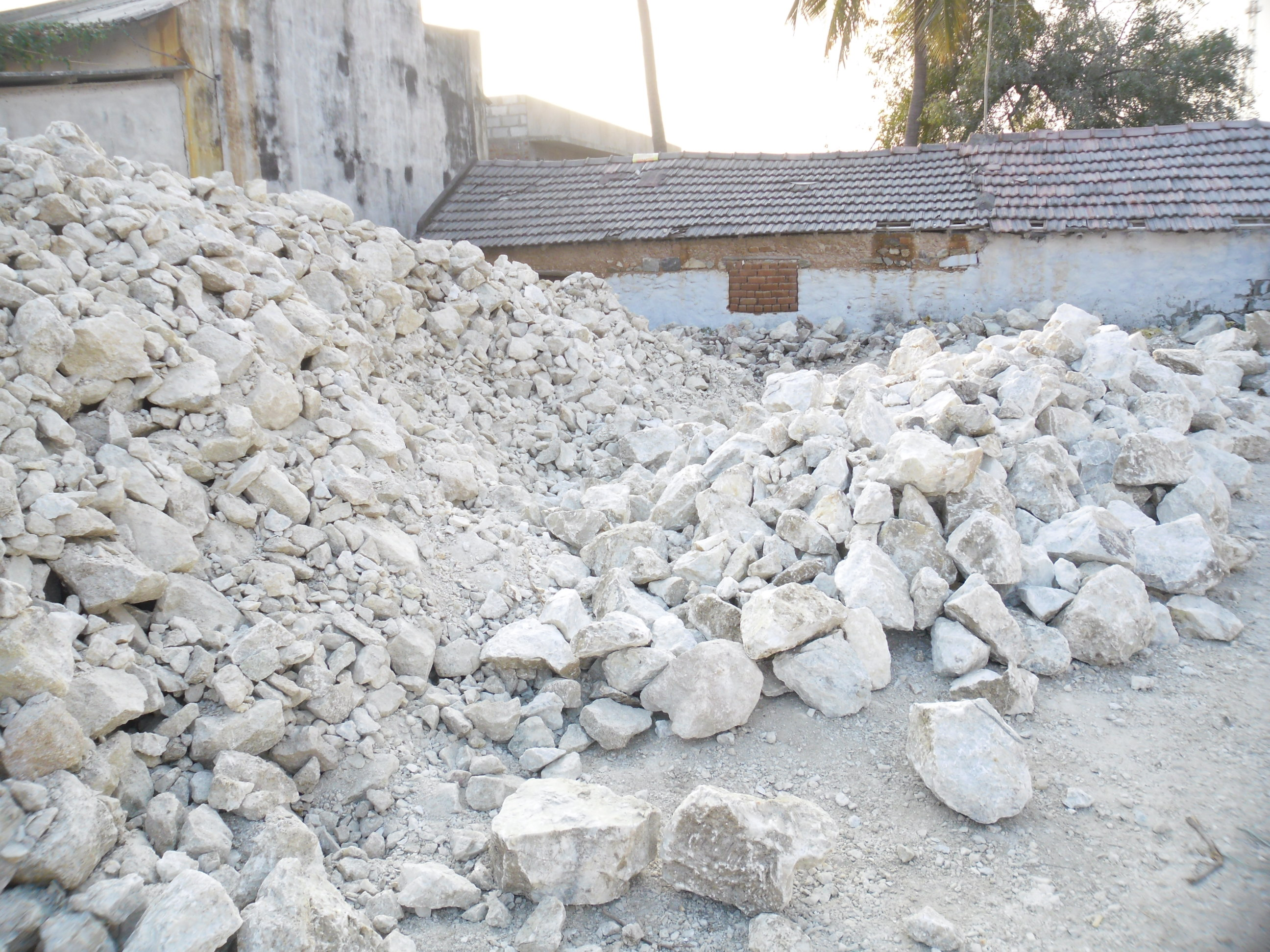
White stones used to make one type of kolam

For special occasions limestone and red brick powder for contrast are also used. Though kolams are usually made with dry rice flour (kolapodi), for longevity, dilute rice paste or even paints are also used. Modern interpretations have accommodated chalk, and more recently vinyl stickers.

Though less colourful than its other Indian contemporary, rangoli, which is often characterised by its vibrant colours, a South Indian Kolam emphasises symmetry, precision, and complexity.

== Patterns ==
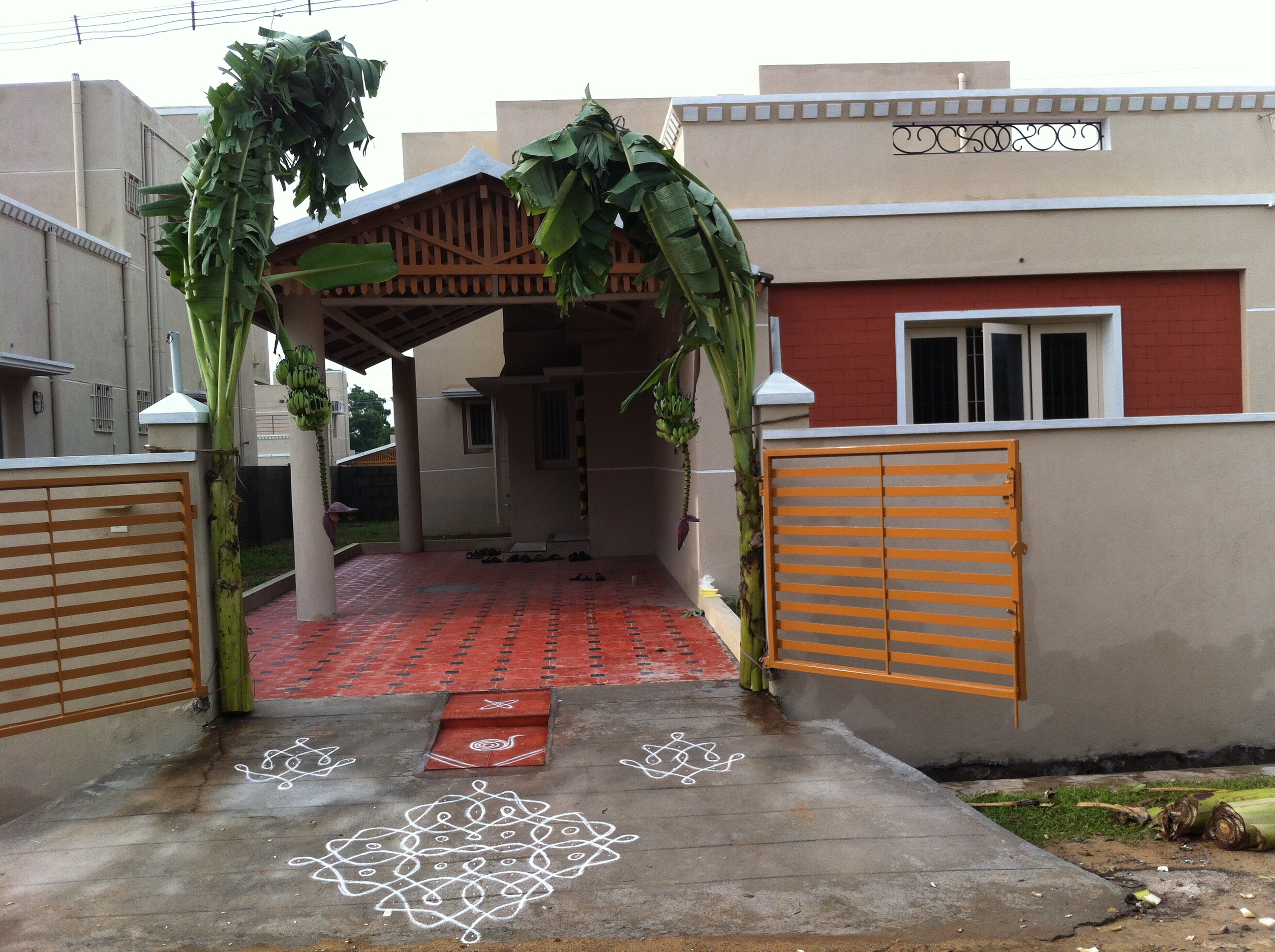
Sikku ('knot' or 'twisted') kolam in front of a house in Tamil Nadu during housewarming

- a pattern in which a stroke (neli, kambi, sikku in Tamil) runs once around each dot (pulli), and returns to the beginning point as a mostly geometrical figure. The stroke is called neli from a snakey line. The stroke has a knot-like (sikku) structure.
- a pattern using only part of the dot grid. If that is the case, the same pattern or a different pattern fills/uses up the remaining dot grids. Most of the time, these patterns together end up becoming a complex pattern.
- a pattern in which a stroke runs around each dot incompletely, but open.
- a pattern in which strokes (kodu/kotto) are connected between the dots. Sometimes they represent kinds of objects, flowers, or animals.
- a pattern in which dots are set in a radial arrangement, called lotus.
- a pattern which is drawn freestyle and mostly coloured.

== Research ==
- The mathematical properties of kolams are studied and replicated in computer science. Algorithms have been developed for generating kolam designs with different patterns.
- Algorithms for drawing kolams are used in the development of picture-drawing computer software.
- Kolams are a topic of research in computational anthropology.
- As kolams have strong relationships with contemporary art and with art history, they are used in the art and media fields.
- Kolams are used to simplify the representation of complex protein structures for easy understanding.

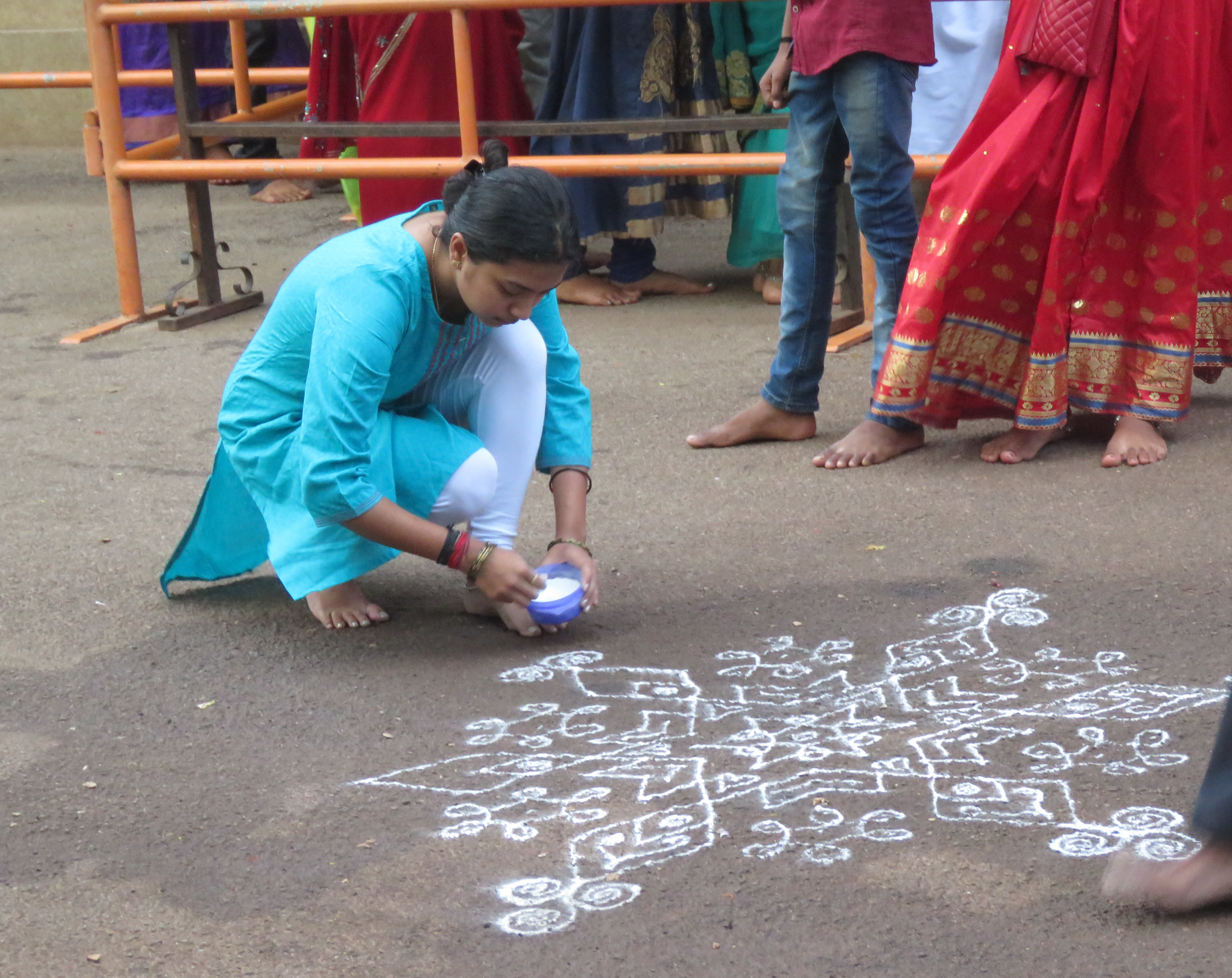
A devotee drawing a kolam at Kollur Mookambika Temple

== Gallery ==
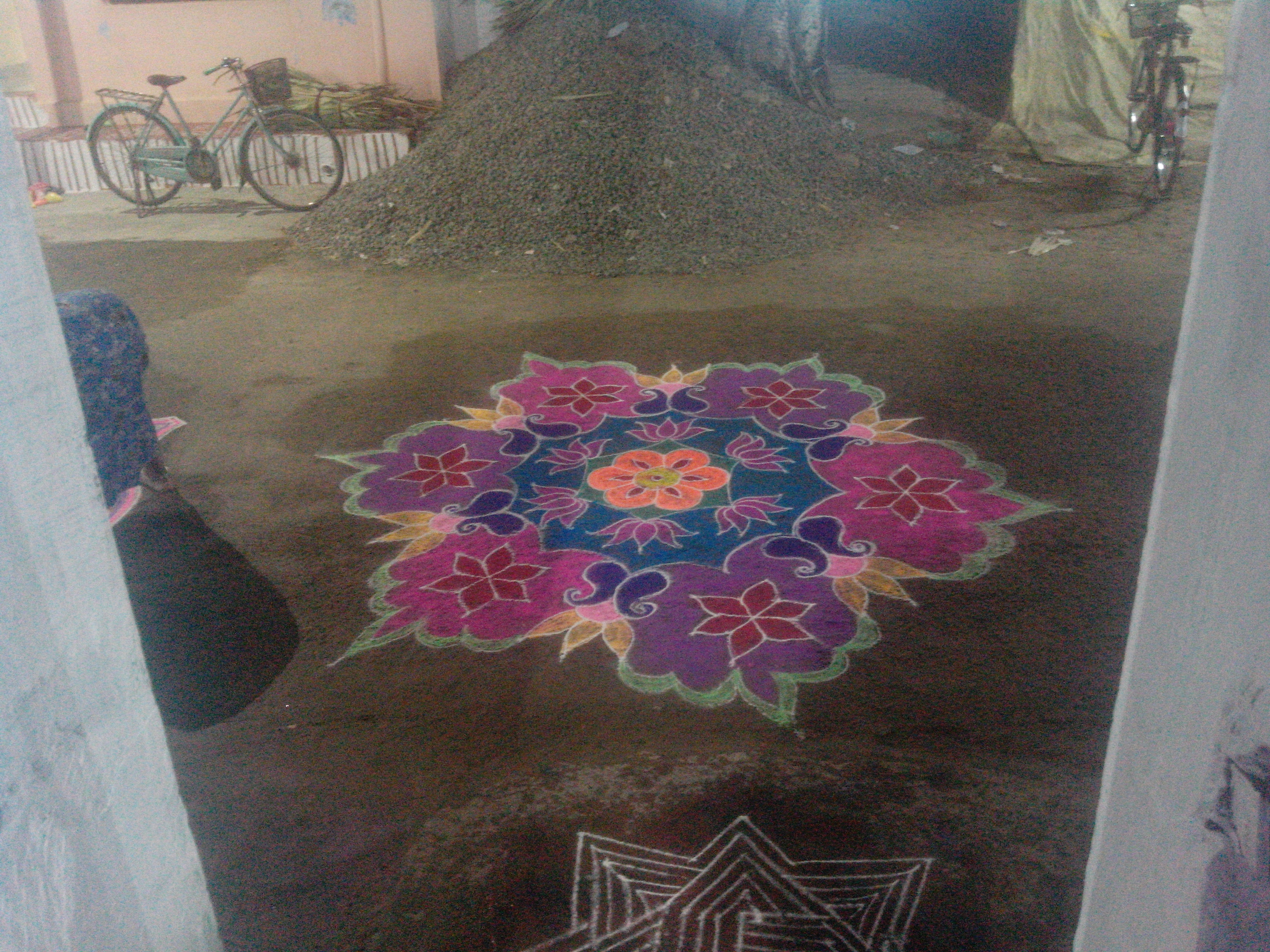
Coloured kolam in Attur

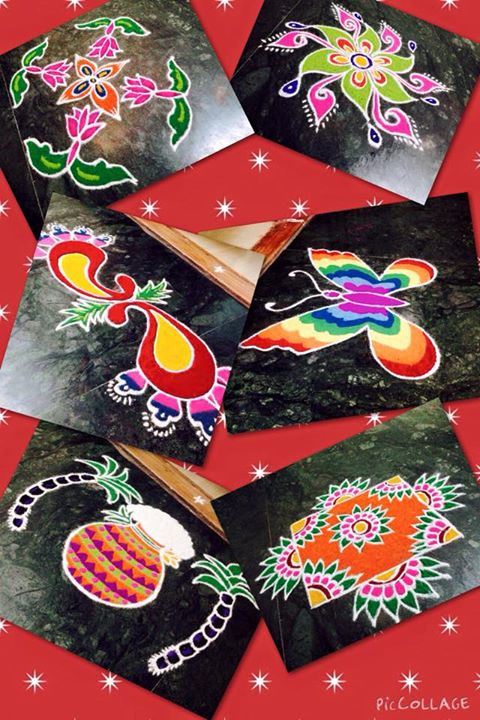
Pongal kolam from Chennai, India

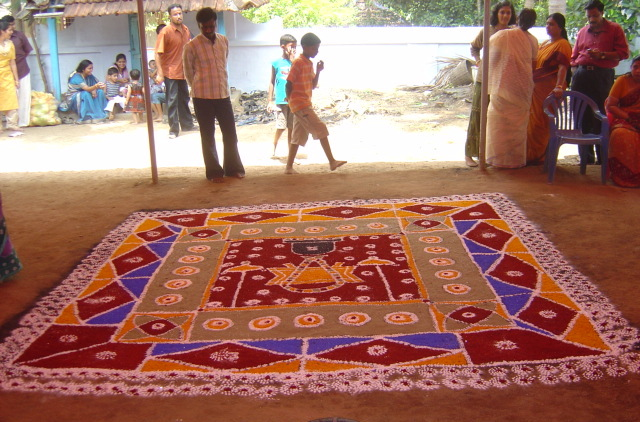
Kolam at Andayil Temple, Pudunagaram

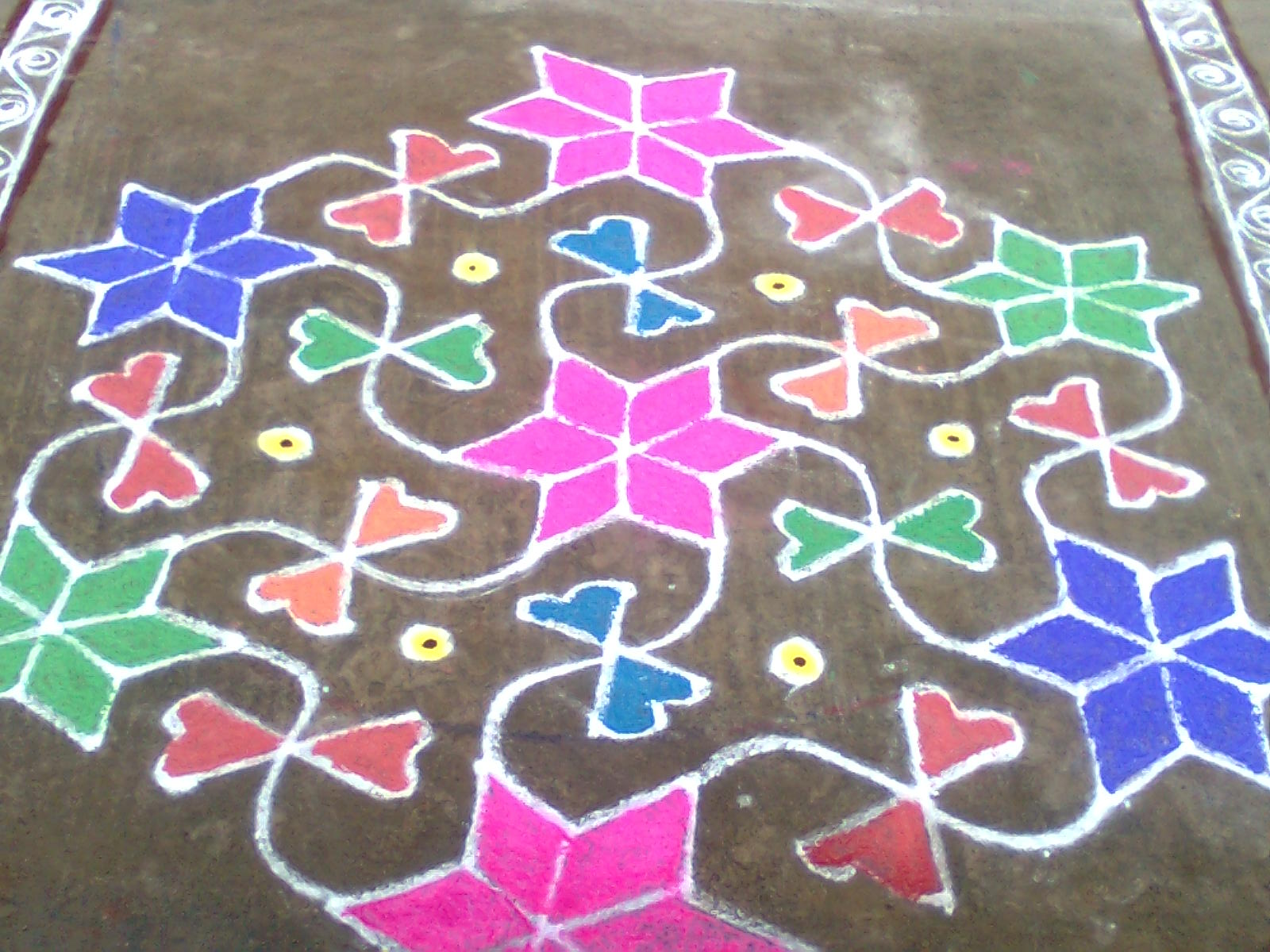
Kolam outside a house in Tamil Nadu, India

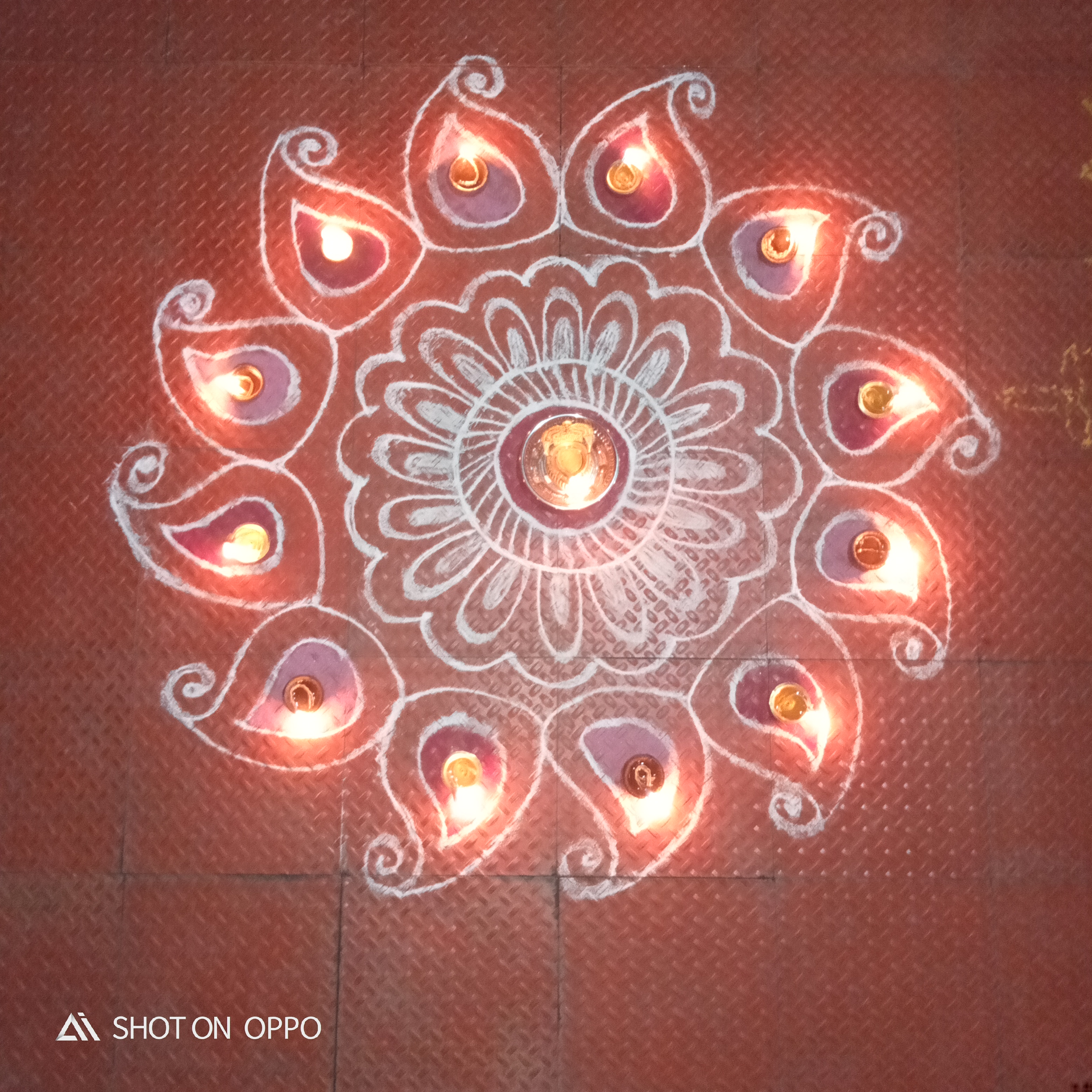
Kolam in Kanyakumari District of Tamil Nadu

== See also ==
- Jhoti chita
- Kalampattu
- Kuberakolam
- Rangoli
- Sand mandala
- Street painting
- Vanuatu Sand drawing
