= Roonstrasse Synagogue =

Orthodox synagogue in Cologne, Germany

- German: Synagoge Roonstraße
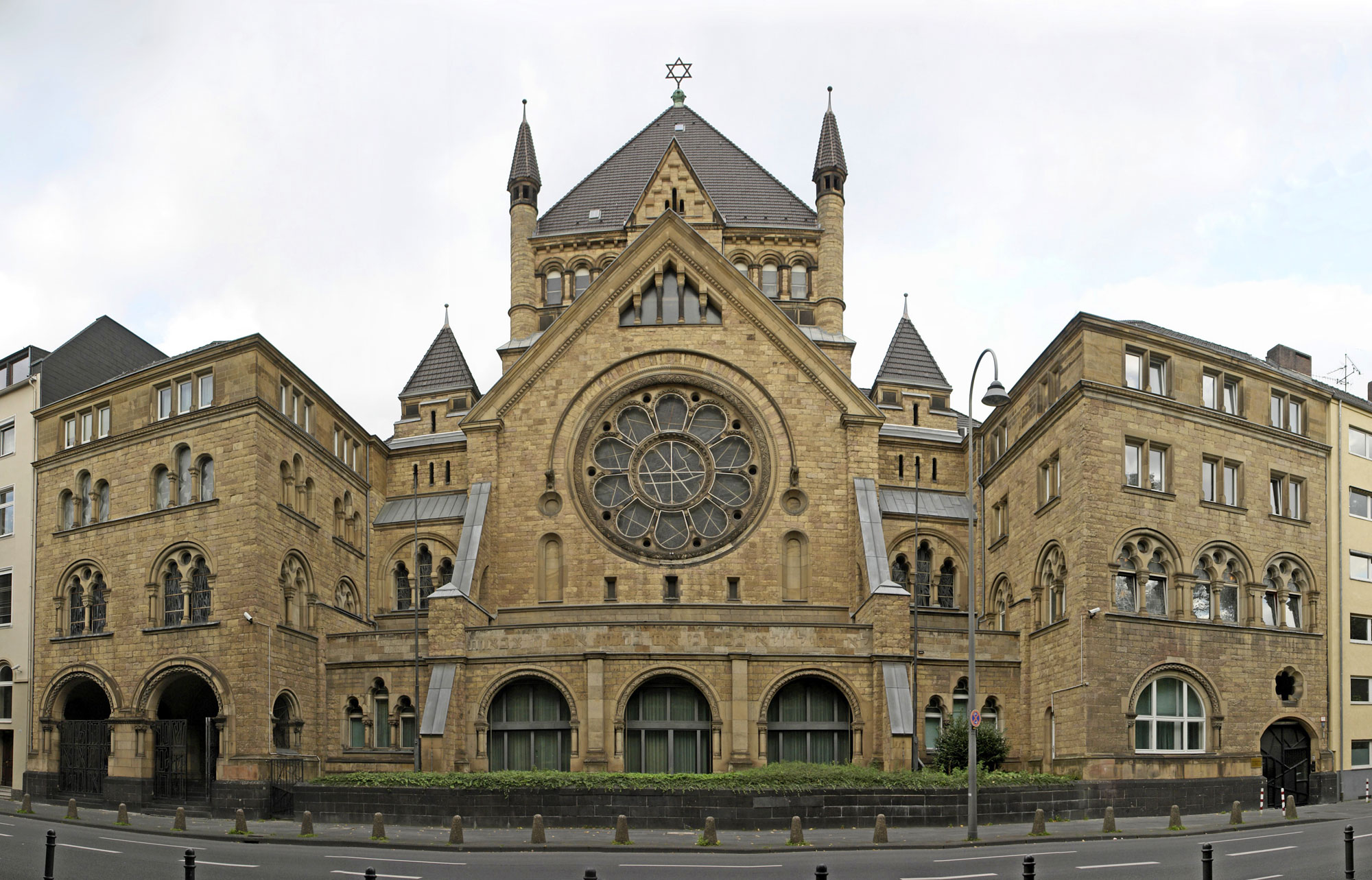
- The synagogue in 2006

- Location of the synagogue in North Rhine-Westphalia

Religion
- Affiliation: Orthodox Judaism
- Rite: Nusach Ashkenaz
- Ecclesiastical or organizational status: Synagogue
- Leadership: Rabbi Yaron Engelmayer
- Status: Active

Location
- Location: 50 Roonstraße, Cologne, North Rhine-Westphalia
- Country: Germany
- Interactive map of Roonstrasse Synagogue
- Coordinates: 50°55′55″N 6°56′11″E

Architecture
- Architects: Schreiterer & Below (1899); Helmut Goldschmidt (1959)
- Type: Synagogue architecture
- Style: Romanesque Revival
- Established: 1798 (as a congregation)
- Completed: 1899 (initial building); 1959 (rebuilt)
- Destroyed: November 9, 1938 (on Kristallnacht; partial)
- Dome: One

Website
- synagoge-koeln.de (in German)

Roonstrasse Synagogue (German: Synagoge Roonstraße) is an Orthodox Jewish congregation and synagogue, located at 50 Roonstraße in Cologne, Germany. The synagogue is the only surviving of the five synagogues of Cologne before the Nazi era.

== History ==
The Jewish community in Cologne has the longest history in Germany, being first mentioned in 321. Expelled in 1424, the Jews did not return to Cologne until 1798. In 1815 the community numbered 150, growing to 8000 in 1895, and 18,281 by 1933, the largest in Germany after Berlin.

=== First synagogue ===
The foundation stone of the Romanesque Revival style building, designed by Cologne architects Schreiterer & Below, was laid on October 23, 1895, and the inauguration took place on March 22, 1899. Like all the other synagogues on the city it was attacked and set alight on November 9, 1938, during Kristallnacht. It was further damaged during World War II, when the front portion was completely destroyed leaving only the burnt out tower and central section.

=== Rebuilt synagogue ===
Returned to the surviving Jewish community in 1945, in the late 1950s they decided to completely rebuild, as it was the only one not completely destroyed. The reconstruction was under the direction of the architect Helmut Goldschmidt, with minor changes on the outside and a simplified interior (with new leadlight windows by Lammers & Warzager), and was reopened on September 20, 1959. On Christmas Eve of that year, the synagogue was smeared with anti-Jewish slogans by members of the far-right Deutsche Reichspartei. West German Chancellor Konrad Adenauer, who had been mayor of Cologne from 1917 until removed by the Nazi government in 1933, made the desecration the subject in his New Year's speech. Since then it has been center of Jewish community of Cologne, and consists of a community center, a small display of items associated with Cologne Jewry, and a kosher restaurant. The interior of the reconstructed synagogue has a vast blue dome.

On August 19, 2005, Pope Benedict XVI visited Roonstrasse Synagogue. This visit was the second ever visit to any synagogue by any of the Popes. There, he condemned Nazism and antisemitism.

== Gallery ==
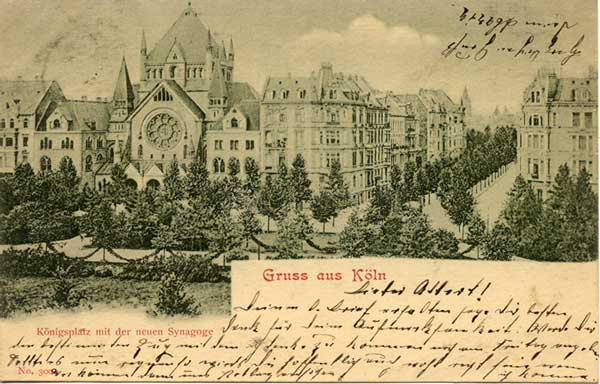
Postcard dated 1903

Postcard dated 1907

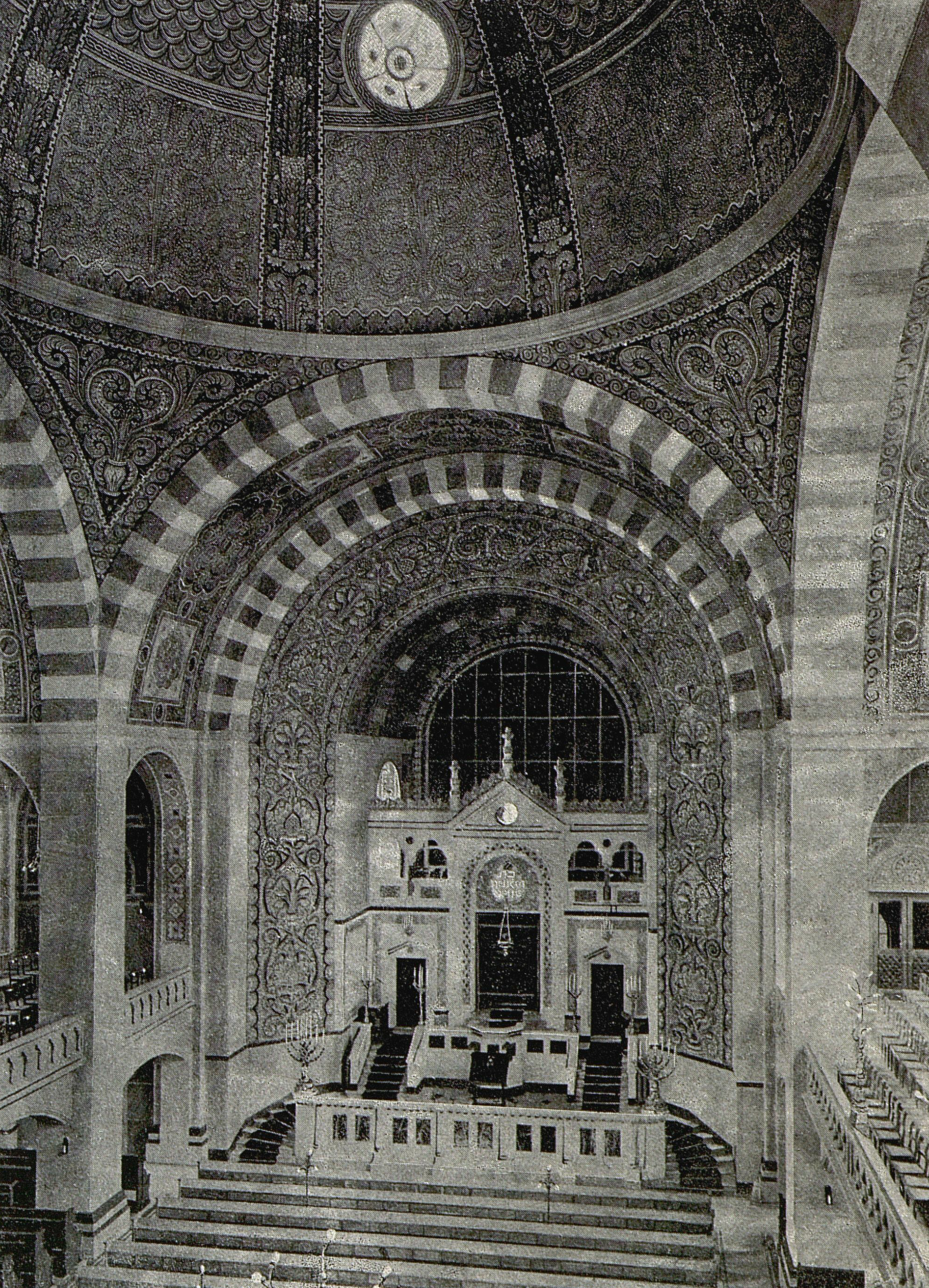
Interior in 1899

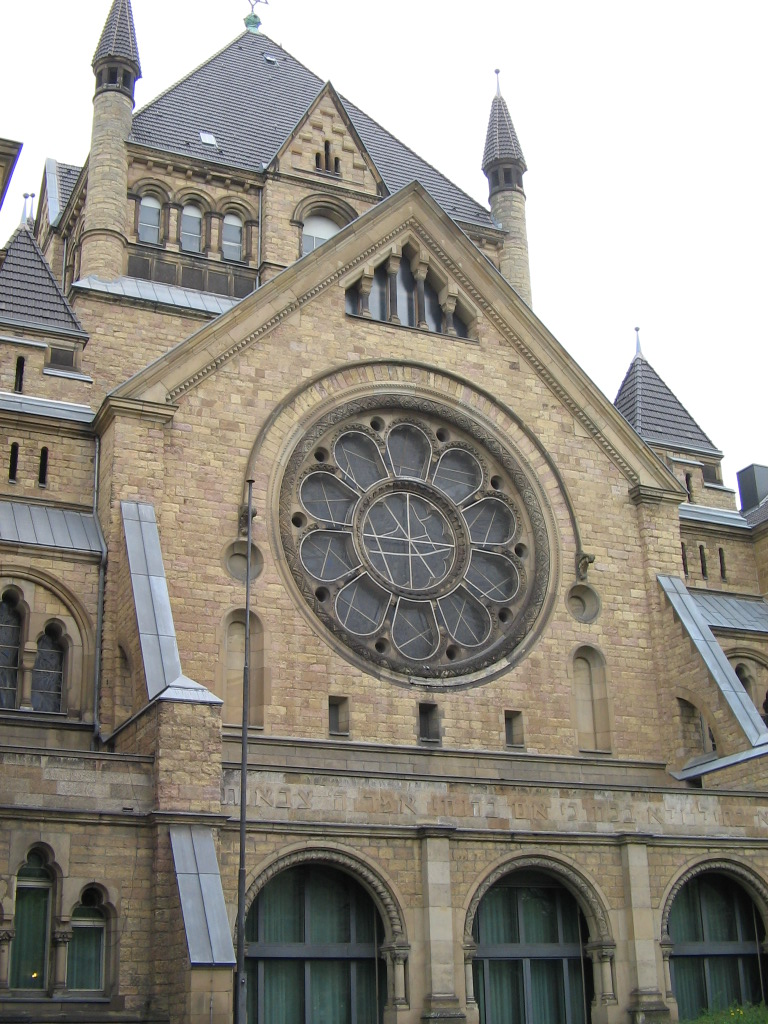
April 2006

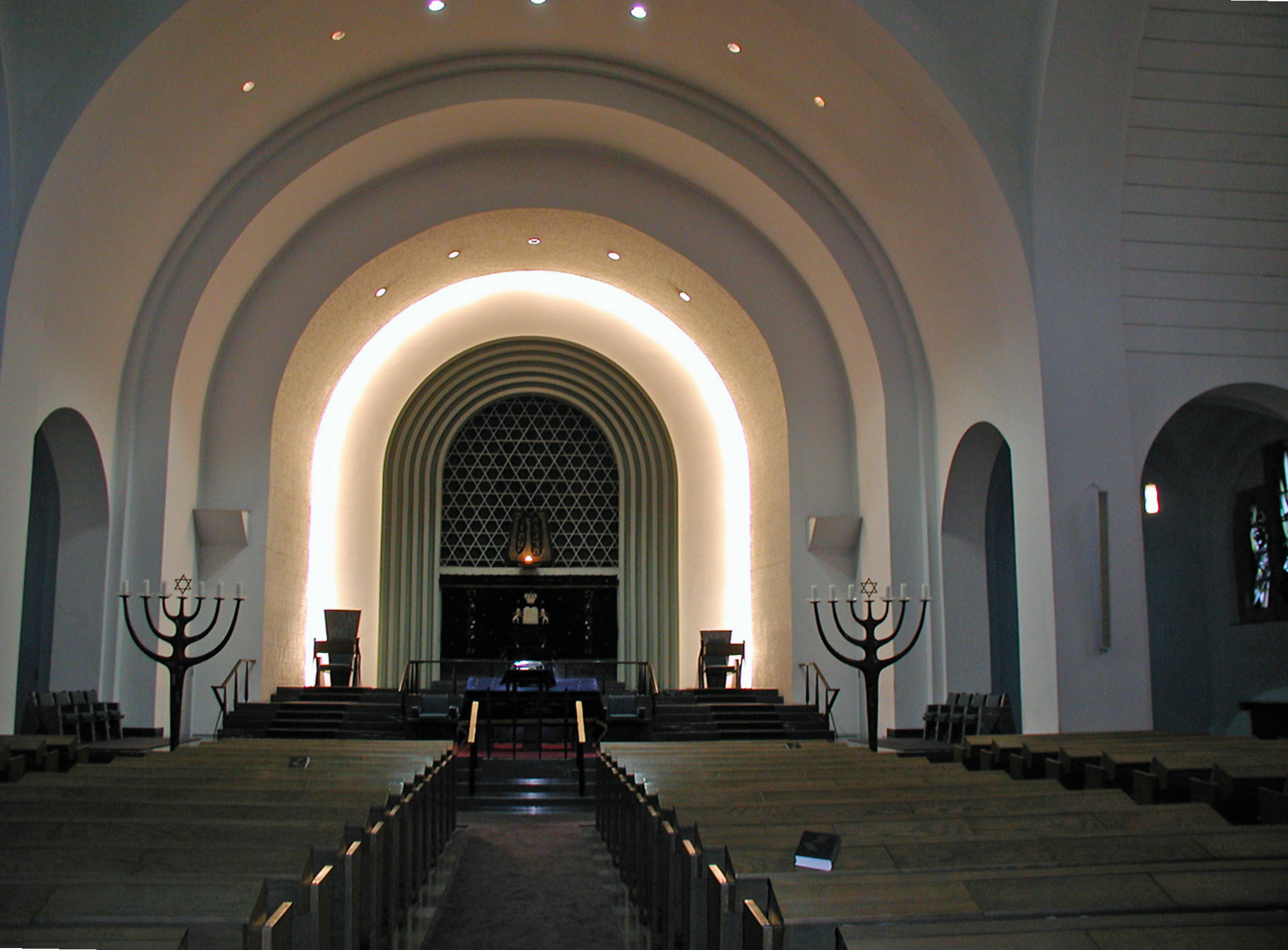
Interior of the synagogue

== See also ==
- History of the Jews in Cologne
- Koln Synagogue (in German)
- List of synagogues in Germany (in German)
