= Rangoli =

Colourful, traditional art form of India

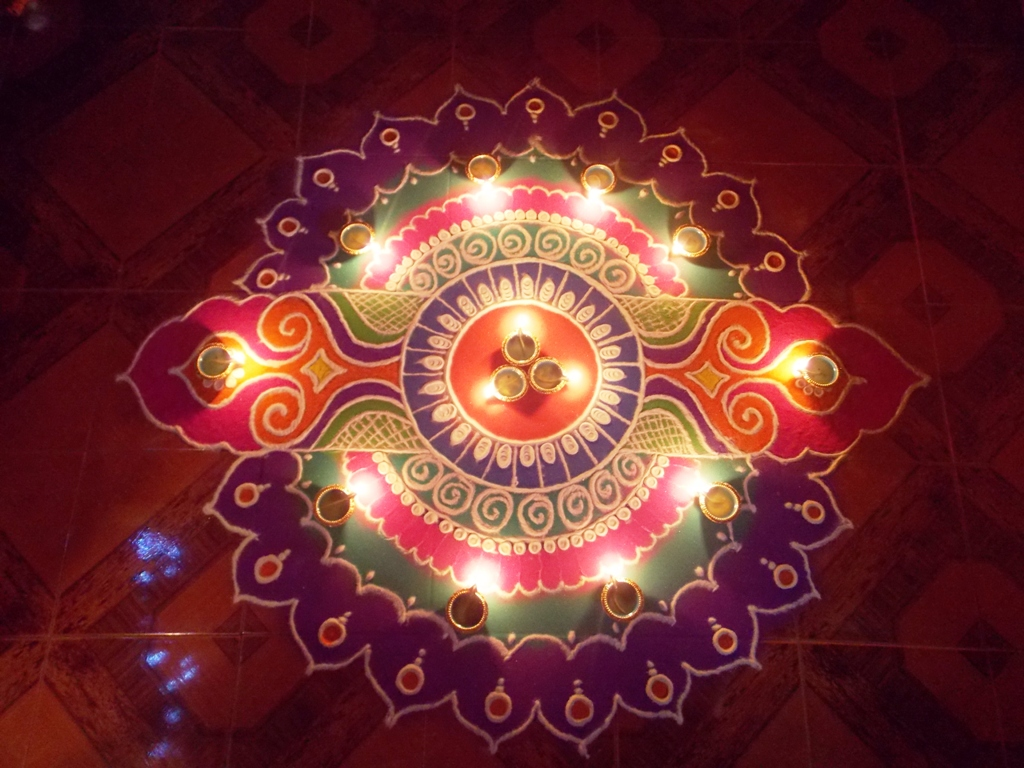
A rangoli on the occasion of Diwali, Goa, India

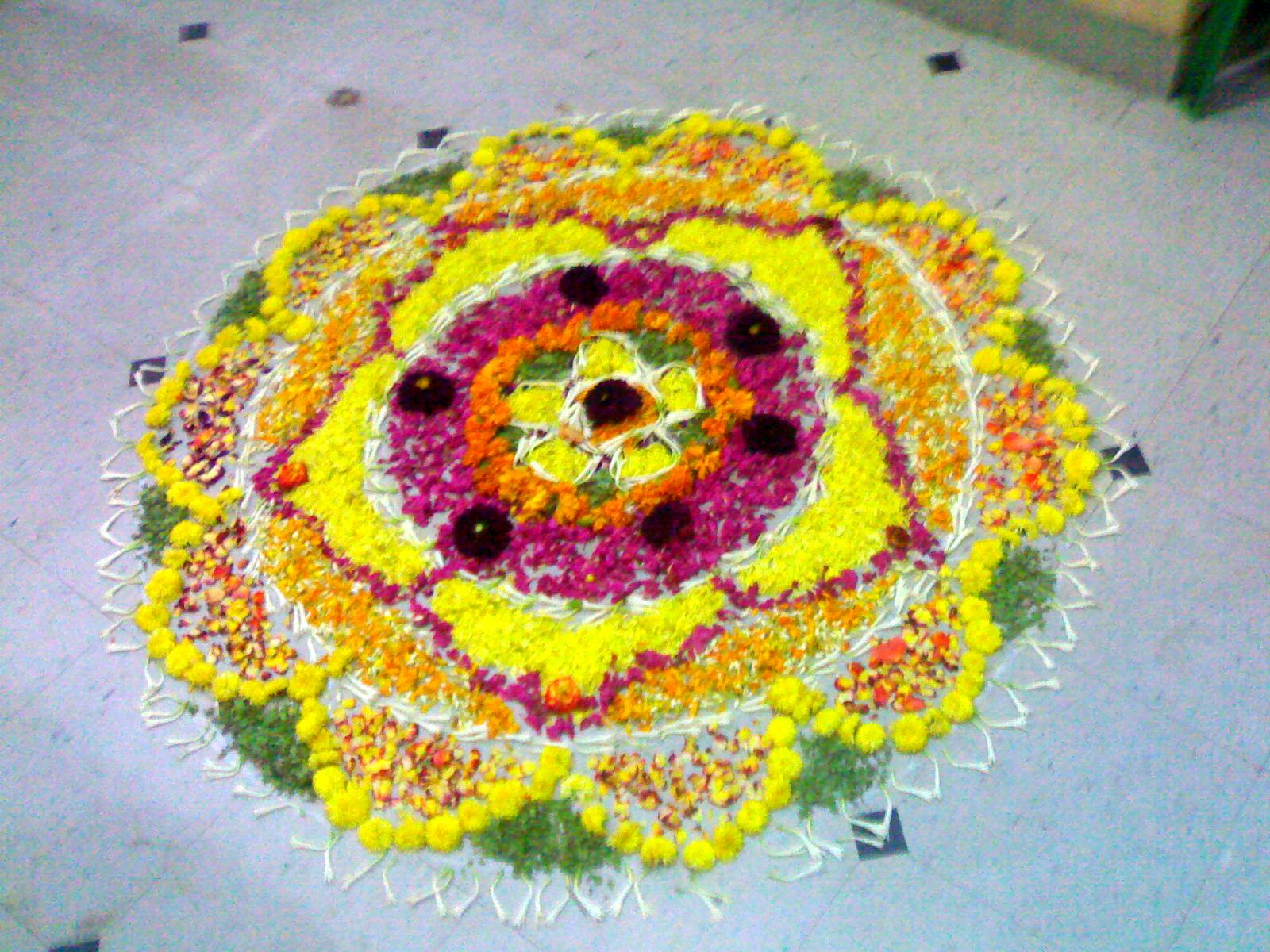
A rangoli made with flowers on the occasion of Onam

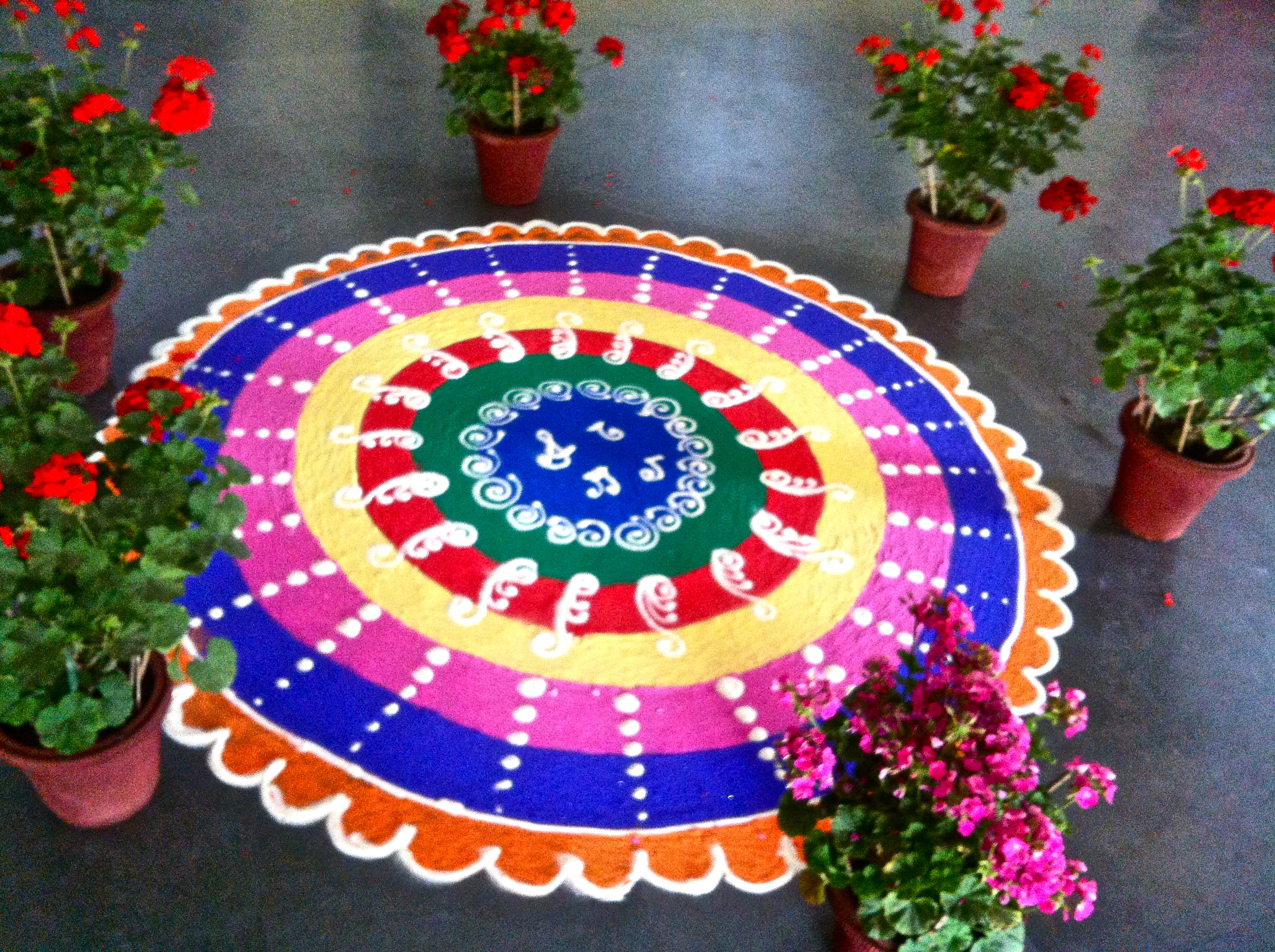
Rangoli at Delhi, India

Rangoli is an art form that originates from the Indian subcontinent, in which patterns are created on the floor or a tabletop using materials such as powdered limestone, red ochre, dry rice flour, coloured sand, quartz powder, flower petals, and coloured rocks. It is an everyday practice in some Hindu households, however, making it is mostly reserved for festivals and other important celebrations, as rangolis are time-consuming. Rangolis are usually made during Diwali or Tihar, Onam, Pongal, Ugadi and other Hindu festivals in the Indian subcontinent, and are most often made during Diwali. Designs are passed from one generation to the next, keeping both the art form and the tradition alive.

Rangoli have different names based on the state and culture. Rangoli hold a significant role in the everyday life of a Hindu household, especially historically when the flooring of houses were untiled. They are usually made outside the threshold of the main entrance, in the early mornings after cleaning the area. The rangoli represents the happiness, positivity and liveliness of a household, and is intended to welcome Lakshmi, the goddess of wealth and good luck. It is believed that a Hindu household without a clean entrance and rangoli is an abode of daridra (bad luck).

The purpose of rangoli is beyond decoration. Traditionally either powdered calcite and limestone or cereal powders are used for the basic design. The limestone is capable of preventing insects from entering the household, and the cereal powders attract insects and keep them from entering the household. Using cereal powders for rangoli is also believed as panch-mahabhoota Seva because insects and other dust microbes are fed. Design depictions may vary as they reflect traditions, folklore, and practices that are unique to each area. Rangoli are traditionally made by girls or women, although men and boys create them as well. In a Hindu household, basic rangoli is an everyday practice. The usage of colours and vibrant designs are showcased during occasions such as festivals, auspicious observances, marriage celebrations and other similar milestones and gatherings.

Rangoli designs can be simple geometric shapes, depictions of deities, or flower and petal shapes appropriate to the given celebrations. They can also be made with elaborate designs crafted by numerous people. The geometric designs may also represent powerful religious symbols, placed in and around household yagna shrines. Historically, basic designs were drawn around the cooking areas for the purpose of discouraging insects and pathogens. Synthetic colours are a modern variation. Other materials include red brick powder and even flowers and petals, as in the case of flower rangoli.

Over time, imagination and innovative ideas in rangoli art have also been incorporated. Rangoli have been commercially developed in places such as five star hotels. Its traditional charm, artistry and importance continue today.

== Etymology ==
From Sanskrit word "रङ्ग" (raṅga) which means colour. Rangoli is derived from the Sanskrit word ‘rangavalli’.

The various names for this art form and similar practices include:

- Raangoli (रांगोळी) in Maharashtra
- muggu (ముగ్గు) in Andhra Pradesh and Telangana
- rangoli/rangole (ರಂಗೋಲಿ/ರಂಗೋಲೆ) in Karnataka
- kolam (கோலம்) in Tamil Nadu
- mandana/mandas (माँडना) in Rajasthan
- alpana/alpona (আল্পনা) in Bangladesh and West Bengal
- haripan/aripan (आरिपना) in Bihar
- muruja (ମୁରୁଜ) or jhoti (ଝୋଟି) or chita (ଚିତା) in Odisha
- chowkpurana (छोवकपुराणा) in Chhattisgarh
- chowkpujan (चौकपूजन) in Uttar Pradesh
- chowk poorana in Punjab
- pookkalam (പൂക്കളം) in Kerala
- Rangoli/sanskarbharti/bharti in Maharashtra
- saathiyo (સાથિયો) or gahuli (ગહુલી) in Gujarat
- aipan/eipan (ऐपण) in Uttarakhand

== In different states ==
In middle India, mainly in Chhattisgarh, Rangoli is called Chaook and is generally drawn at the entrance of a house or any other building. Powdered quartz, dried rice flour or other forms of white dust powder is used for drawing Chaooks. Although there are numerous traditional Chaook patterns, many more can be created depending on the creativity of the person who draws it. It is considered auspicious as it signifies showering of good luck and prosperity on the house and in the family. It is not drawn like a Bolka picture. Patterns are created based on certain systems. Generally, women get up early in the morning and clean the area just outside the entrance of their houses with cow dung, sprinkle the area with water and draw the Chaook. In Maharashtra and Karnataka, rangoli are drawn on the doors of homes so that evil forces attempting to enter are repelled.

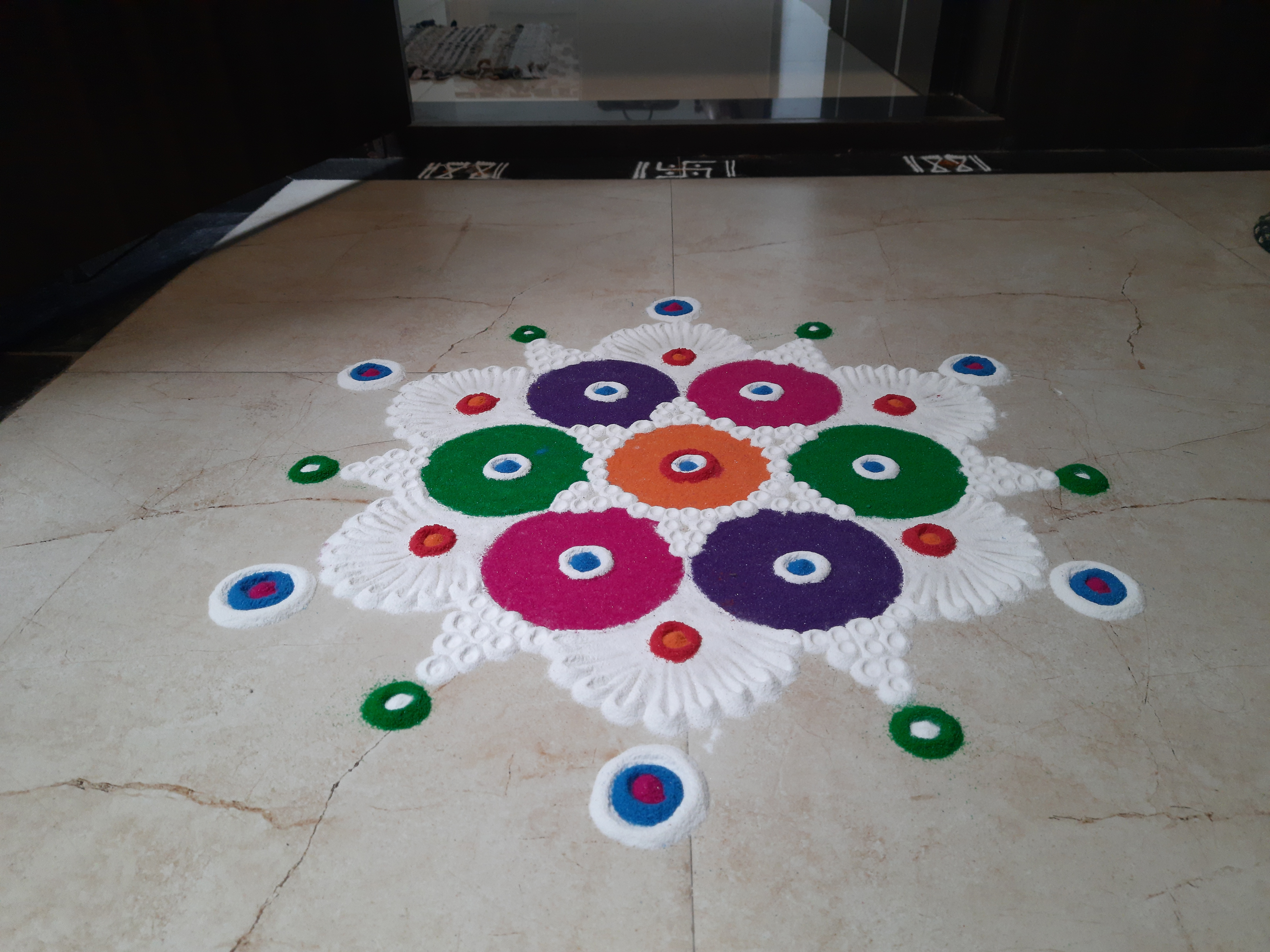
Rangoli drawn in front of a house door on the occasion of a festival in Maharashtra

During the festival of Onam in Kerala, flowers are laid down for each of the ten days of the celebration, the design growing larger and more complex every day. In Tamil Nadu, Andhra Pradesh and Karnataka, and many parts of Maharashtra, the rangoli or Kolam is drawn upon the ground or floor daily. The designs are geometric and symmetrical मूल्यतः shapes but the materials used are similar rangoli: powdered quartz, rice flour or slurry is used. In Rajasthan the Mandana are painted on walls. Mmandne, various festivals, major festivals and can be categorized based on seasons. Different shapes depending on the size of it also can be shared. Kumaon's "writing beat 'or in a variety of plotting symbols Thapa, artistic designs, Bellbutoan is used. Alikhthap of society apart – separated by different groups – different icons and art media is used. In Odisha, the Murja is put at the aangan of every home in front of the Tulsi plant called "Tulasi chahura". The rangoli patterns mostly are dedicated to Lord Krishna and Lord Jagannath. The Murja festival is observed during the auspicious month of Kartika ending on Kartika Purnima. In West Bengal, Alponas are created using rice flour. Alponas are similar to kolams and are created during major festivals that Bengalis celebrate like Durga Puja, Kali Puja, Saraswati Puja, Kojagori Lakshmi Puja and Jogodhatri Puja.

Shape, design and material can be influenced by regional traditions. A square grid is common in North India as is a hexagonal grid in South India; Onam Rangoli are typically circular. In North India, the colour is most often based on gypsum (chirodi), in South India on rice flour and Onam Rangoli are typically flower based. The rapid and widespread migration and mixing of people within India can be seen by the way these styles are now freely adopted and mixed across the country. It is also becoming common to see experimentation like sawdust-based floating rangoli, freeform designs, and exotic materials.

It is particularly notable that the Tamil version of the rangoli, the Kolam, prizes symmetry, complexity, precision, and intricacy rather than the flamboyance of rangoli found in North India.

== Elements ==
=== Colours and designs ===
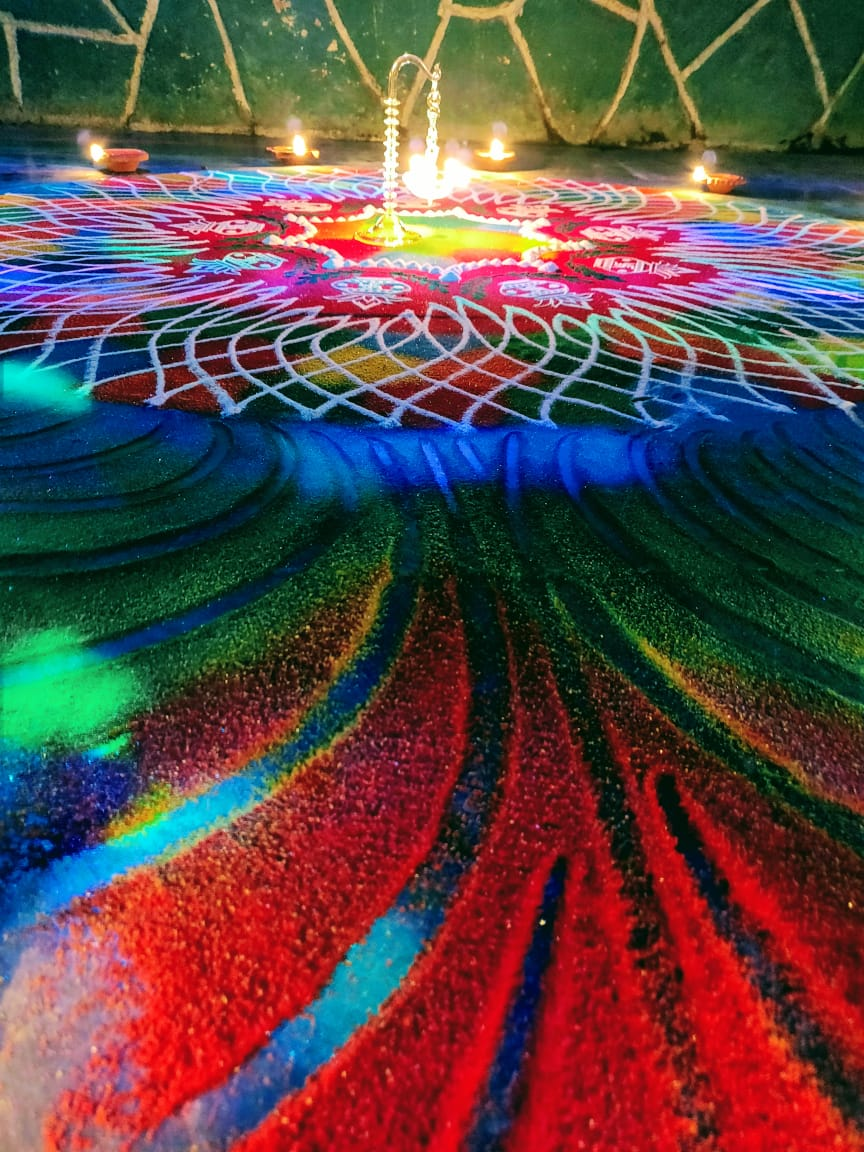
Rangoli created for Diwali in Pune, Maharashtra, India

The rangoli's most important element is being colourful. These are auspicious symbols that have a central role in the design. The designs are passed down from one generation to the next as they are made – and is required to make these symbols. Traditionally, each new generation learns the art and thus a family keeps the tradition intact. Some major symbols used in rangoli are the lotus flower and its leaves, mango, Tue vase, fish, different kind of birds like parrots, swans, and peacocks, human figures, and foliage. Rangoli is often made on special occasions like Diwali. Some special patterns for Diwali Rangoli are the Diya also called Deep, Ganesha, Lakshmi, flowers or birds of India. The patterns include the face of Hindu deities, geometric shapes peacock motifs, and round floral designs. Many of these motifs are traditional and are handed down by the previous generations. This makes rangoli a representation of India's rich heritage and the fact that it is a land of festivals and colour. People celebrate Diwali with rangoli patterns.

=== Materials ===
The materials used to make the rangoli are easily found everywhere. Therefore, this art is prevalent in all homes, rich and poor. Normally the major ingredients used to make rangoli are: Pise rice solution, the dried powder made from leaves, colour, charcoal, burned soil, sawdust, and similar substances. Rangoli is also created using coloured powdered quartz, rice, dry flour, flower petals, turmeric (pasupu), vermillion (sindooram) and coloured sand. Since 2025, coloured sand rangoli products have been recalled in Australia and New Zealand due to potential asbestos contamination.

=== Background surface ===
The background of rangoli uses a clear floor or wall or Llype is used. Rangoli can be made in a yard in the middle, corners, or as a bell is created around.

Dehri gateway is another tradition of making rangoli. God's seat, depending on lamp, place of worship and sacrifice on the altar is a tradition of decorating rangoli.

=== Mandala rangoli ===
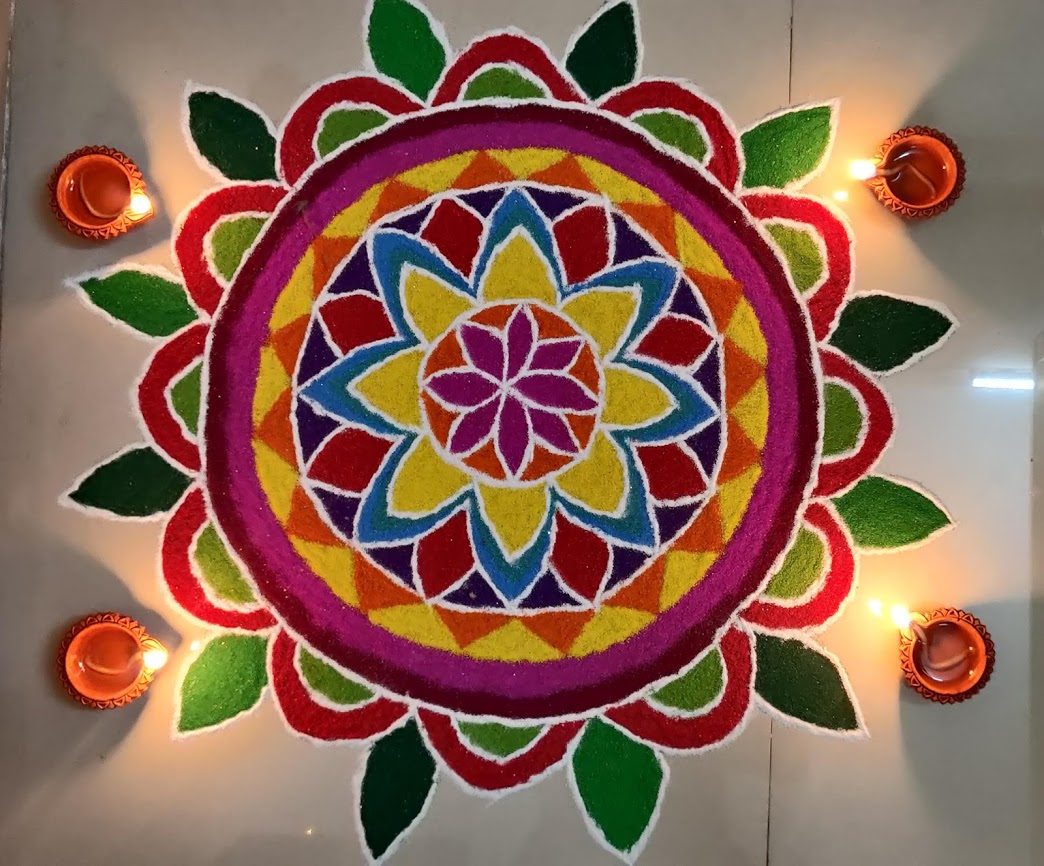
A mandala rangoli, made in an Indian household during Diwali

Mandala is a diagram, chart or geometric pattern that represents the cosmos metaphysically or symbolically, a time-microcosm of the universe, but was originally meant to represent wholeness and a model for the organizational structure of life itself, a cosmic diagram that shows the relation to the infinite and the world that extends beyond and within various minds and bodies. It also represents the spiritual journey, starting from outside to the inner core, through layers.

== Creation ==
There are two primary ways to make a rangoli, dry and wet, referring to the materials used to create the outline and (if desired) fill that outline with colour. Using a white material like chalk, sand, paint or flour, the artist marks a centre-point on the ground and cardinal points around it, usually in a square, hexagon or circle depending on region and personal preference. Ramifying that initially-simple pattern creates what is often an intricate and beautiful design. Motifs from nature (leaves, petals, feathers) and geometric patterns are common. Less common but by no means rare are representational forms (like a peacock, icon or landscape). "Readymade Rangoli" patterns, often as stencils or stickers, are becoming common, making it easier to create detailed or precise designs.

Once the outline is complete, the artist may choose to illuminate it with colour, again using either wet or dry ingredients like paints, coloured rice-water, gypsum powder, coloured sand or dry pigments. The artist might also choose unprocessed materials like seeds, grains, spices, leaves or flower petals to achieve lifelike hues. Modern materials like crayons, dyes or dyed fabrics, acrylic paints and artificial colouring agents are also becoming common, allowing for brilliant and vibrant colour choices. A newer but less artificial method involves using cement coloured with marble powder. This rather precise method requires training, but beautiful portraits can be drawn in this medium.

== Religion ==
In Sri Vaishnavism, it is said that Andal, one among the twelve Alvars, worshipped the deity Krishna, and was married to him in the month of Margaḻi. During this month, several unmarried women get up before dawn, and draw a rangoli to welcome the deity. Mentions of rangoli creation are also found in Hindu literature. There are also references of rangoli in legends such as Ramayana - at Sita's wedding pavilion where there is a discussion about rangoli. The cultural development of rangoli in the south originated in the era of the Chola rulers.

== Gallery ==
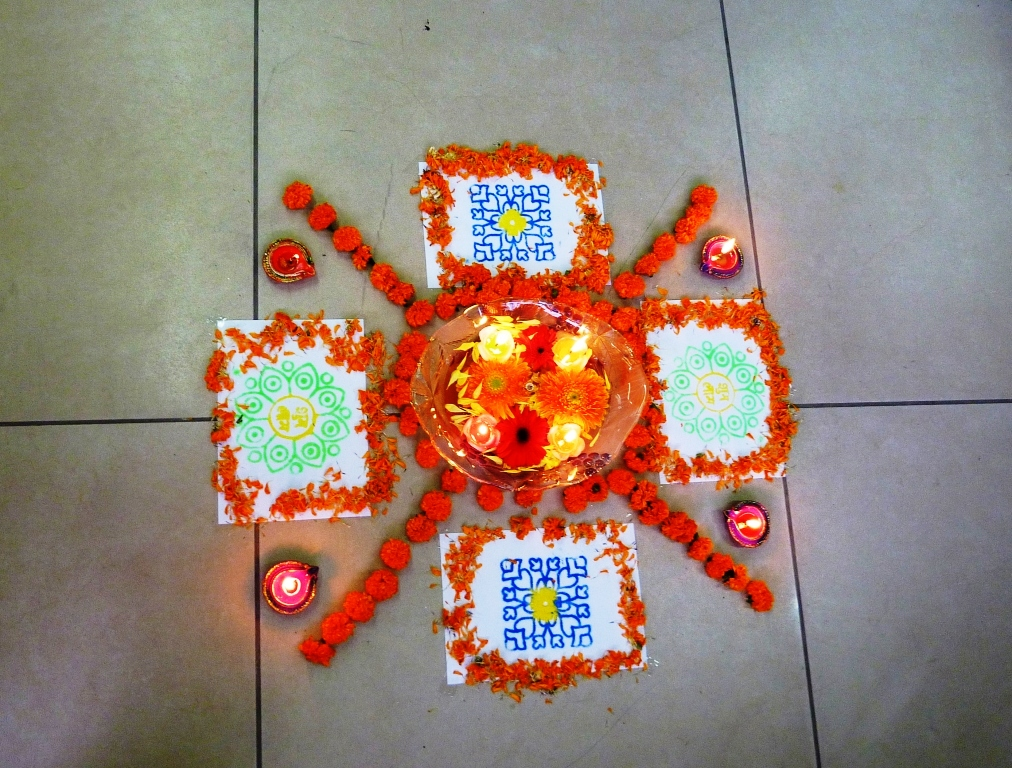
Rangoli design for Diwali on floor Chandigarh Airport. 2010

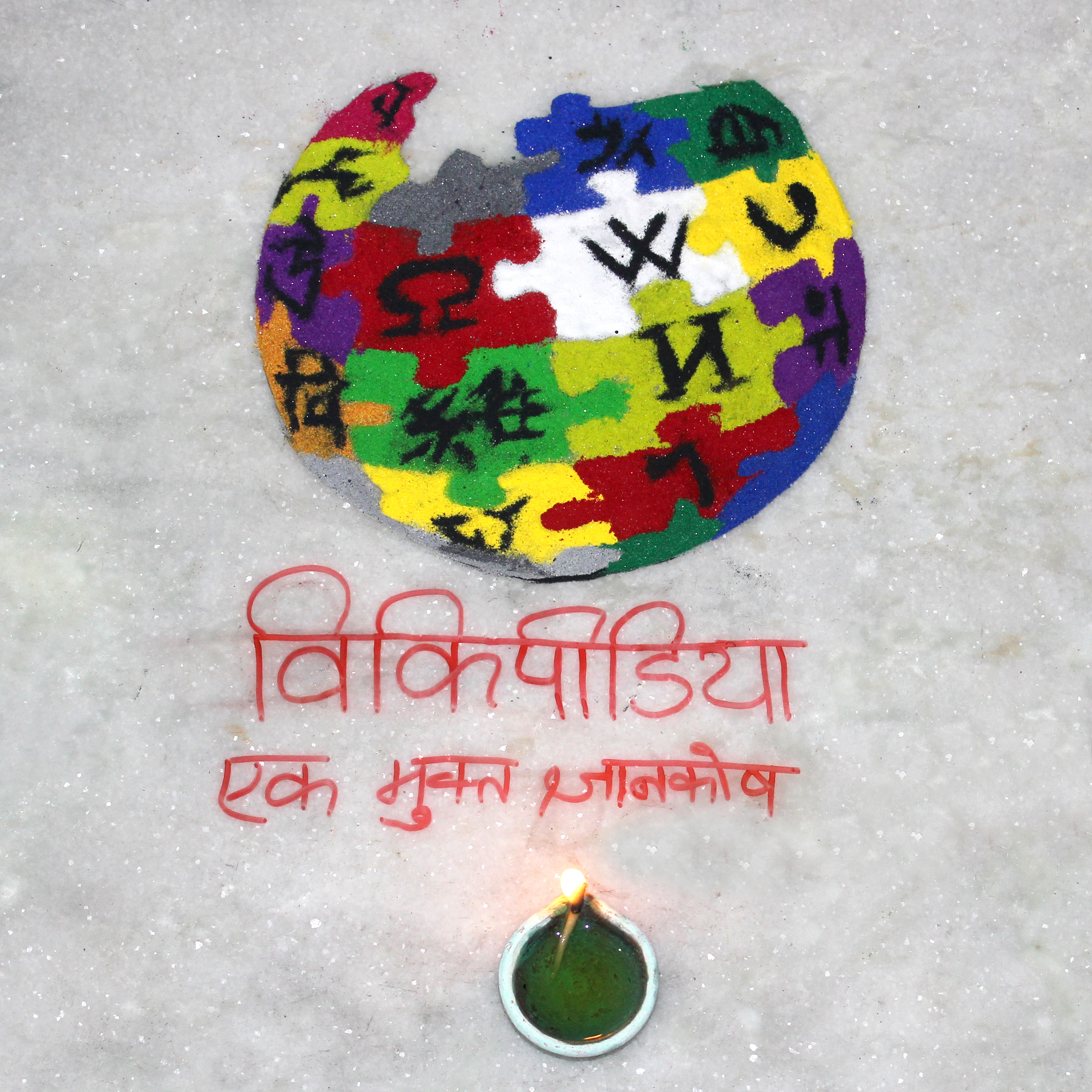
A rangoli in the form of the Wikipedia Logo for Hindi Wikipedia

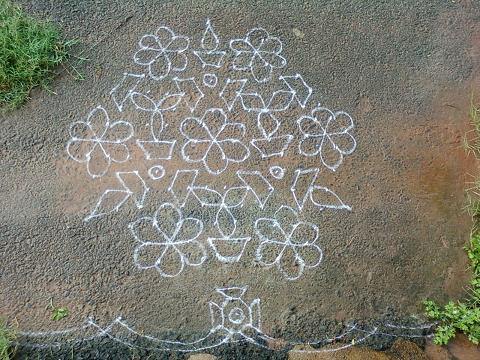
Rangoli is either left as uncoloured drawing or it is filled with various coloured powders.

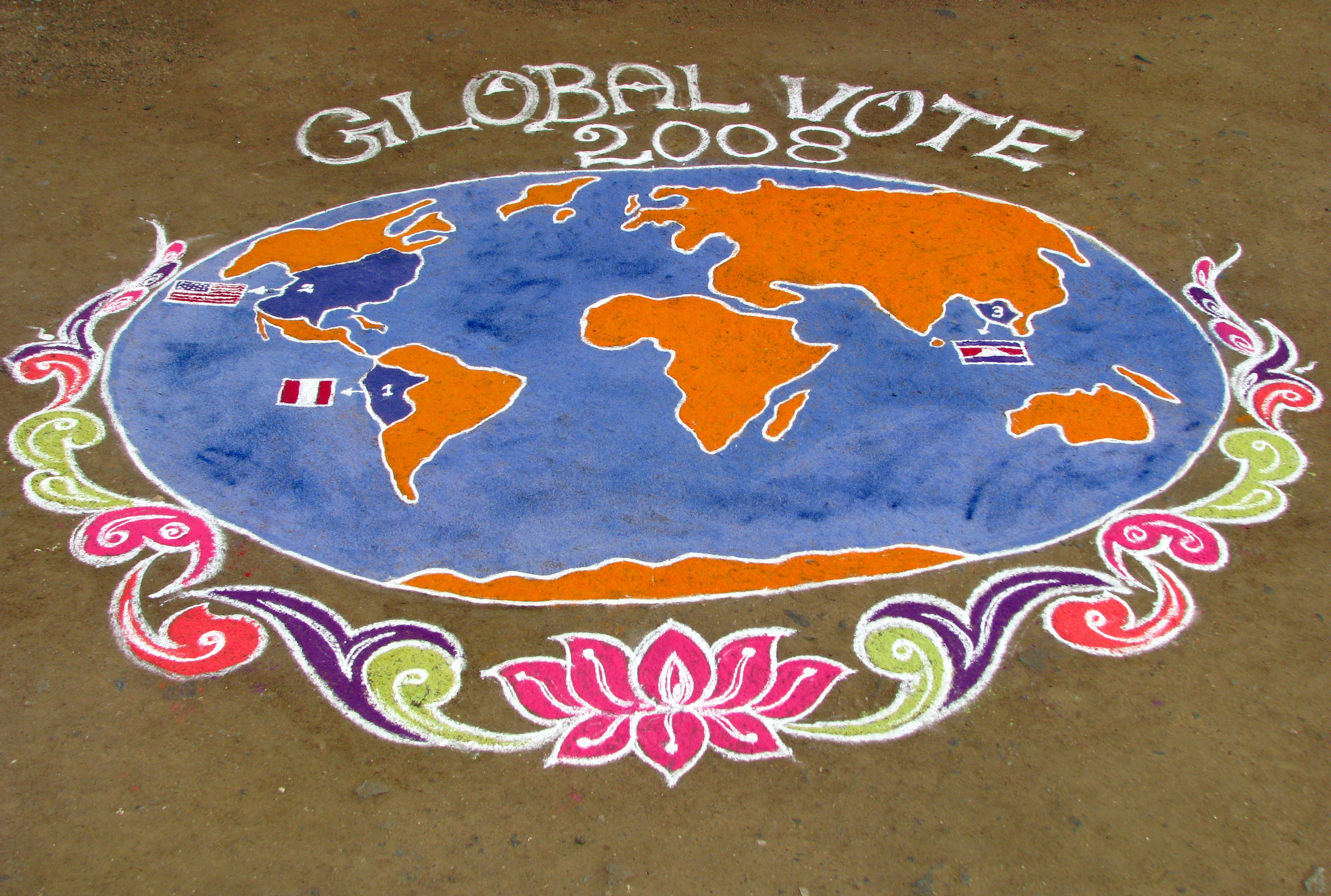
Rangoli of Global Events

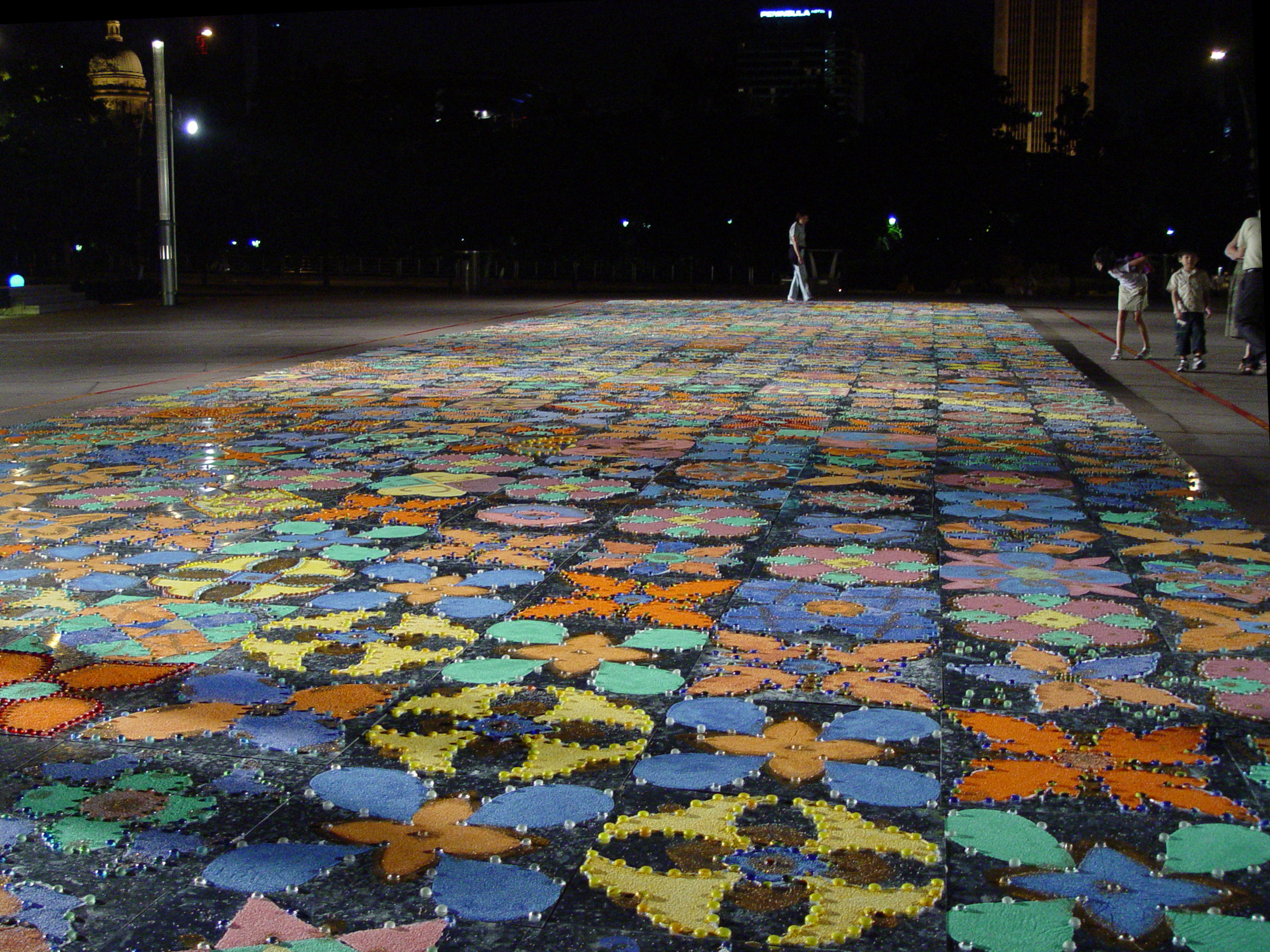
Rangoli in Singapore

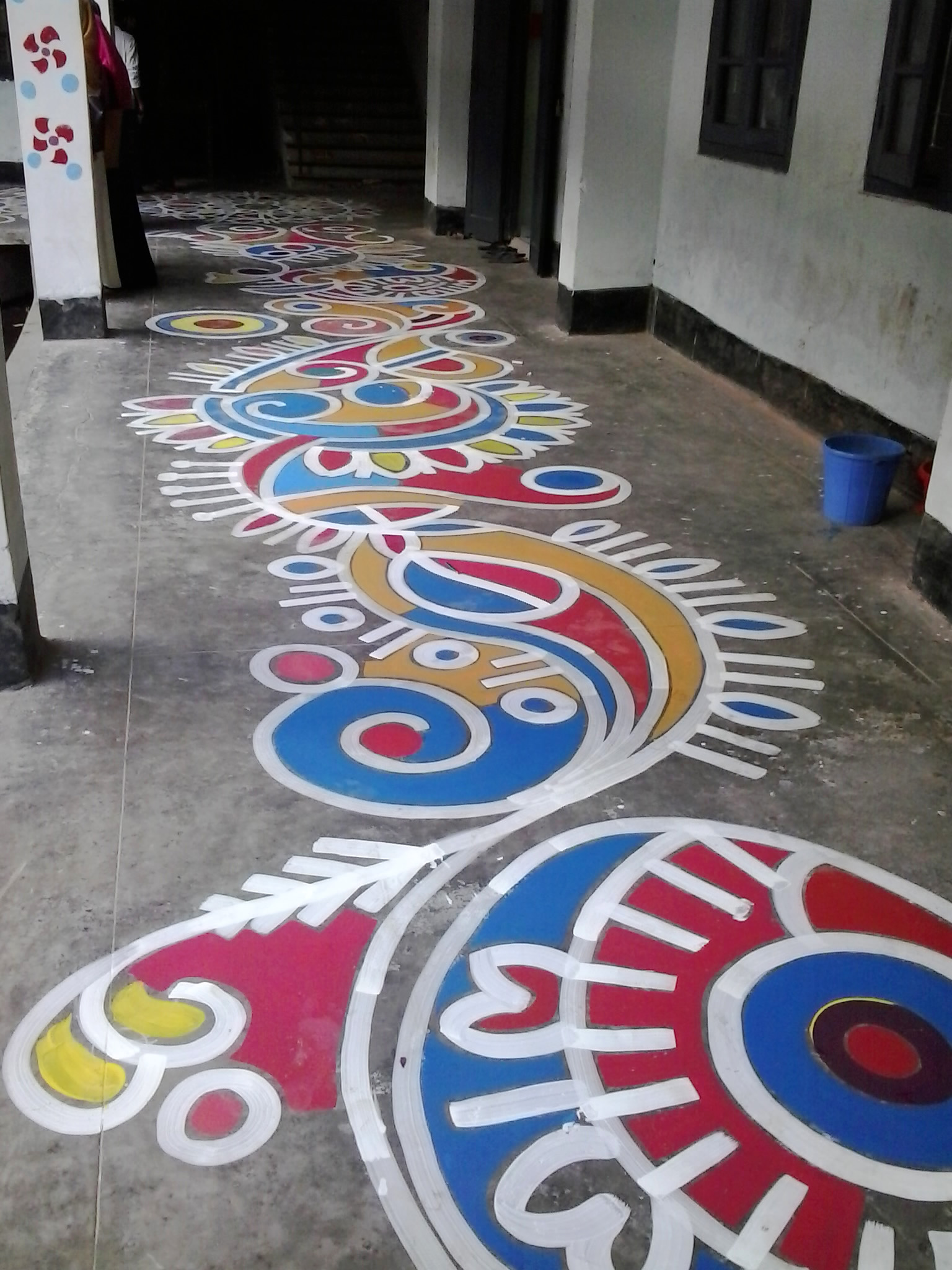
Alpana (painted Rangoli) in Rajshahi, Bangladesh

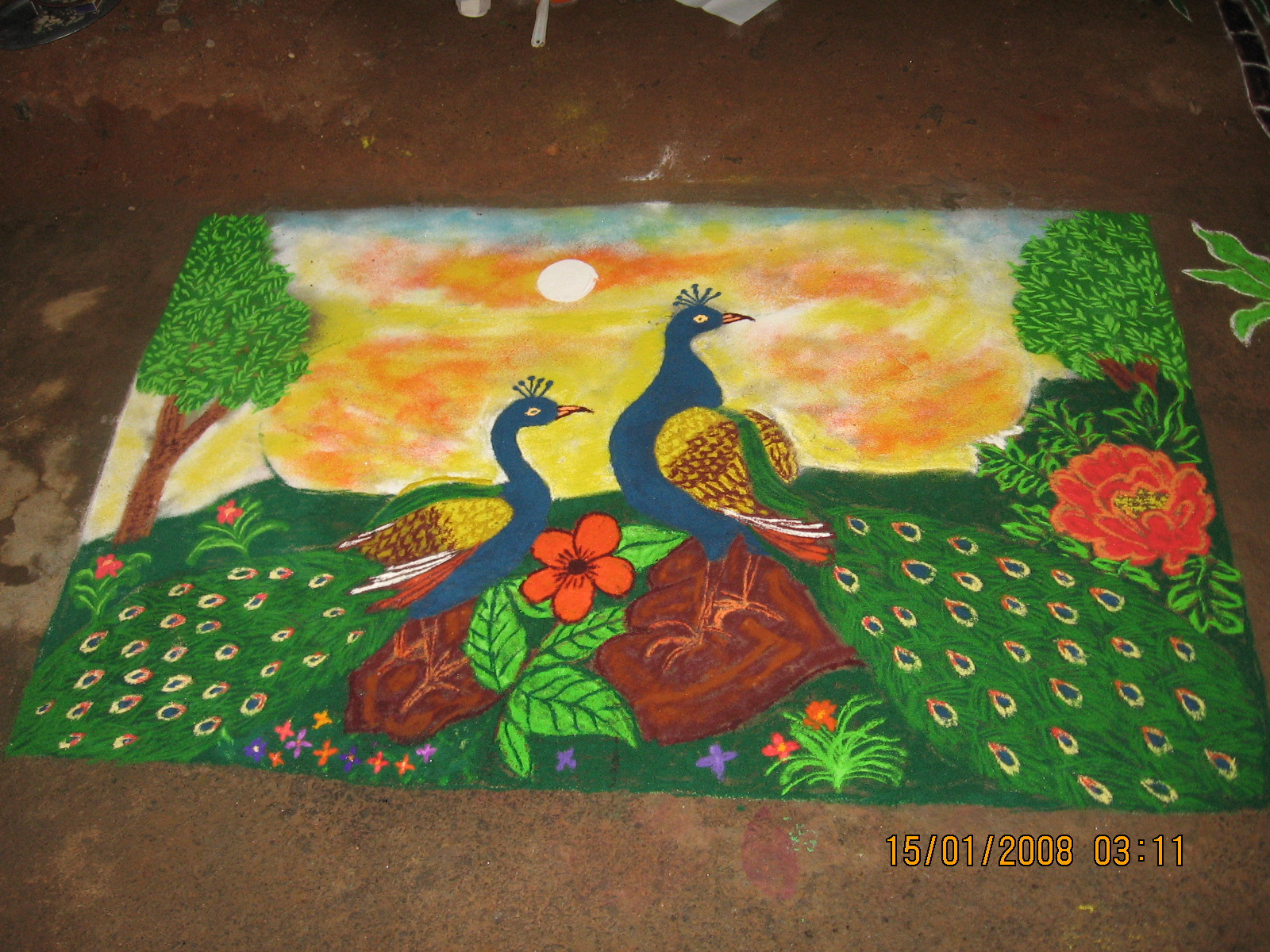
Rangoli(Kolam) of Peacock in Tamil Nadu

Nature Scene in Rangoli during a Vijayadashami festival, in Maharashtra

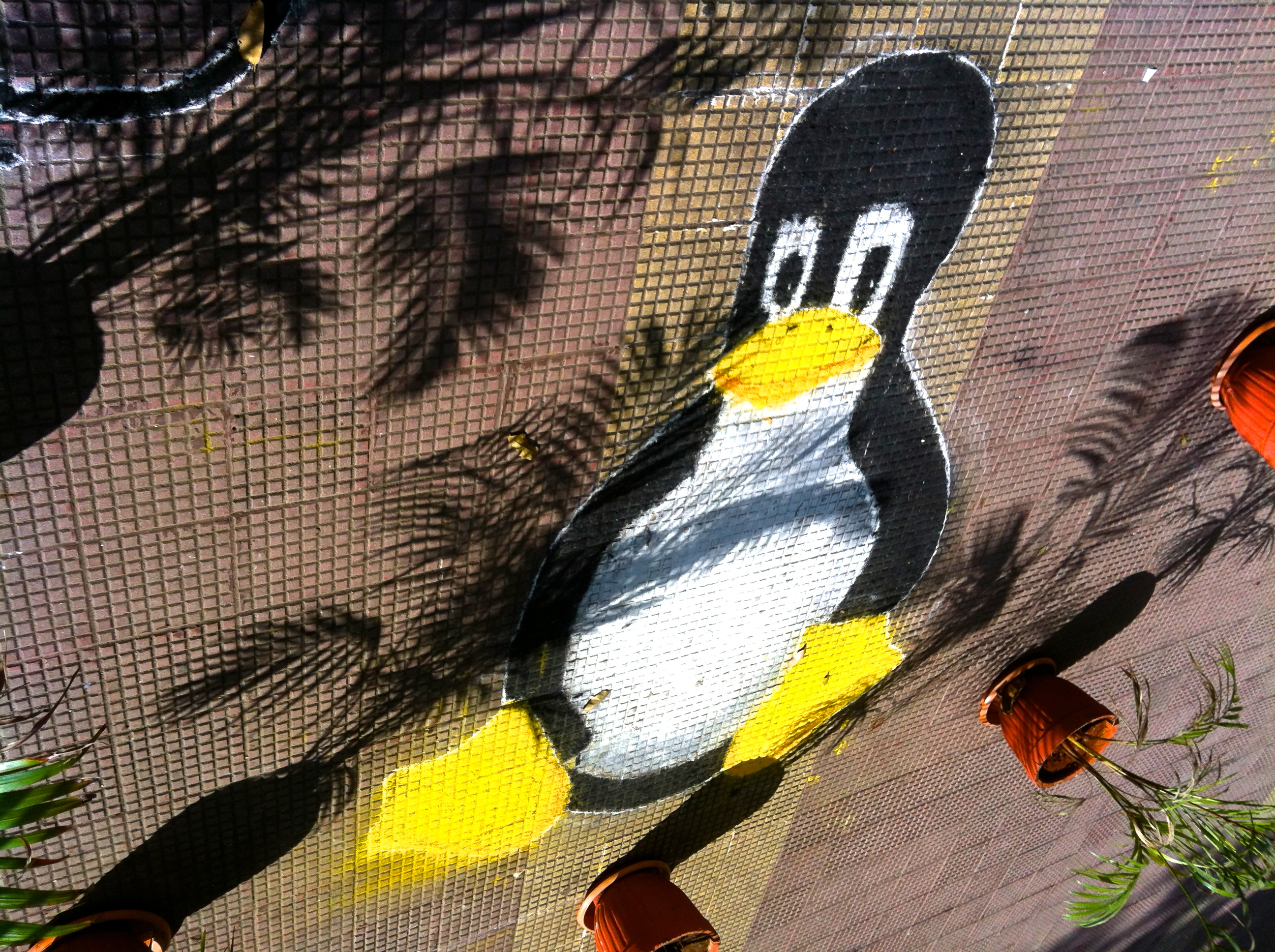
A Tux rangoli by students at GNUnify'13, Pune

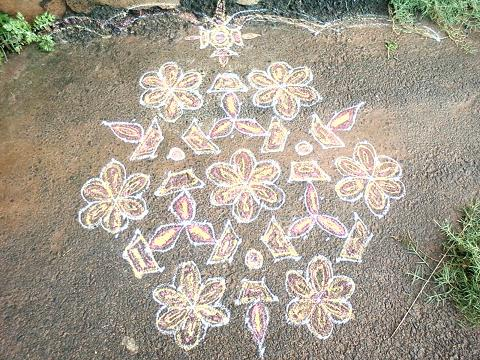
Rangoli is drawn in front of the house especially on festival days

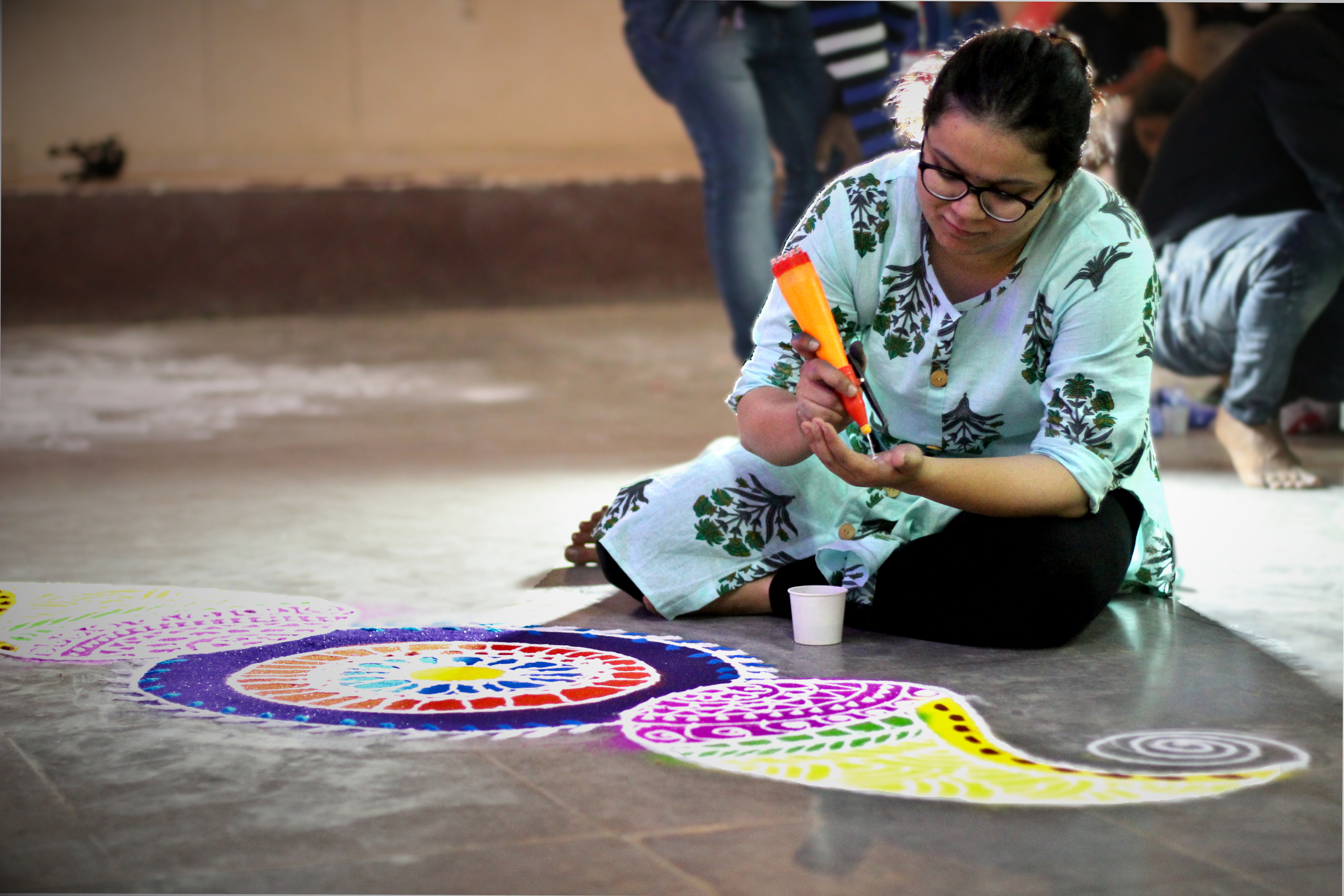
Rangoli in making

Rangoli being prepared by a Rangoli mould vendor in Bangalore

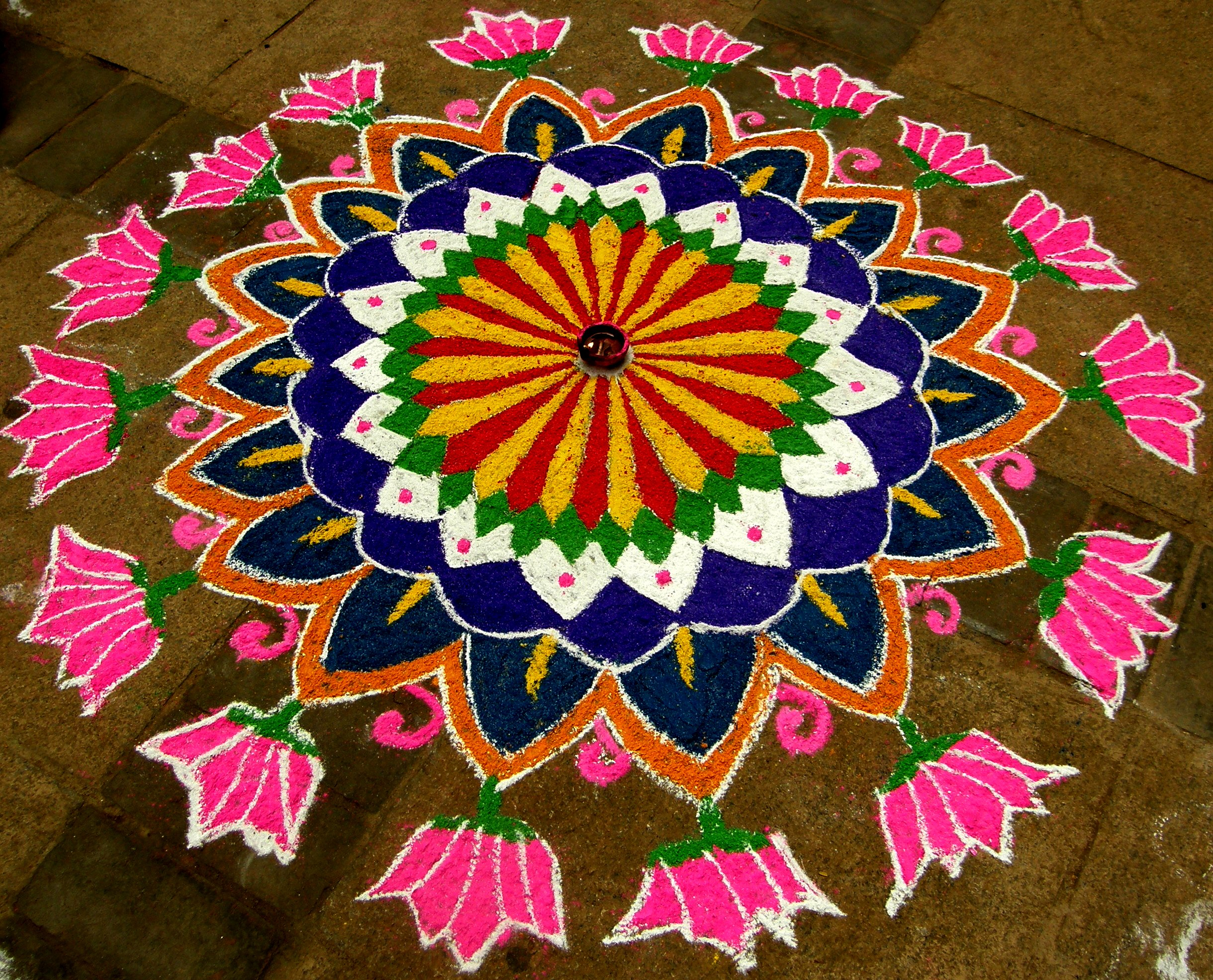
Rangoli(Kolam) at Chennai, India

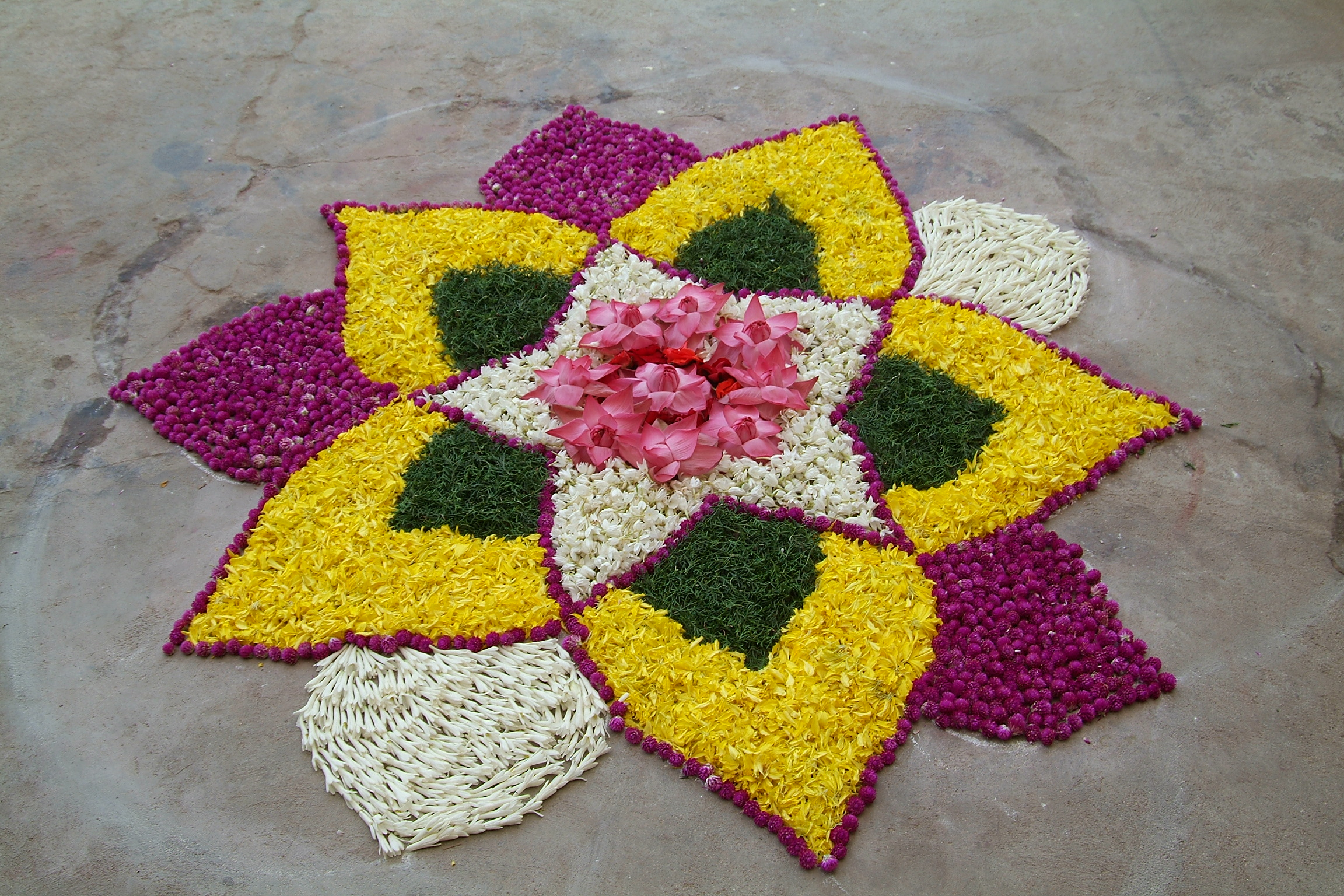
Rangoli with flowers at Chennai

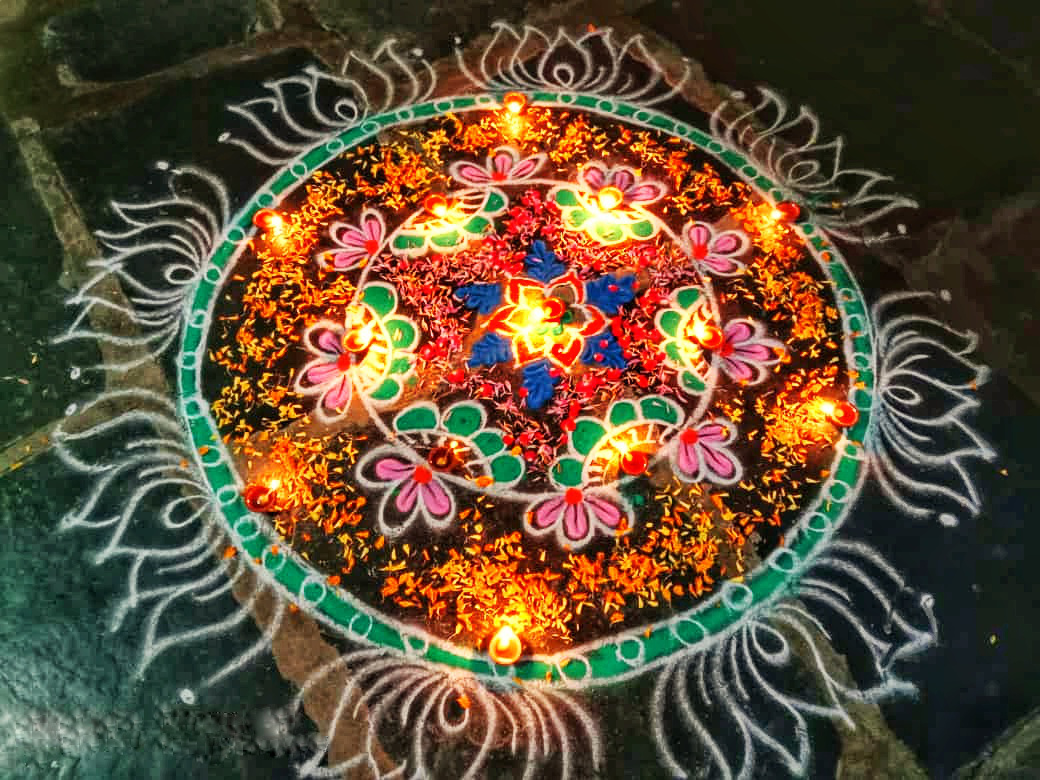
Rangoli ''(Muggu)'' at Andhra Pradesh

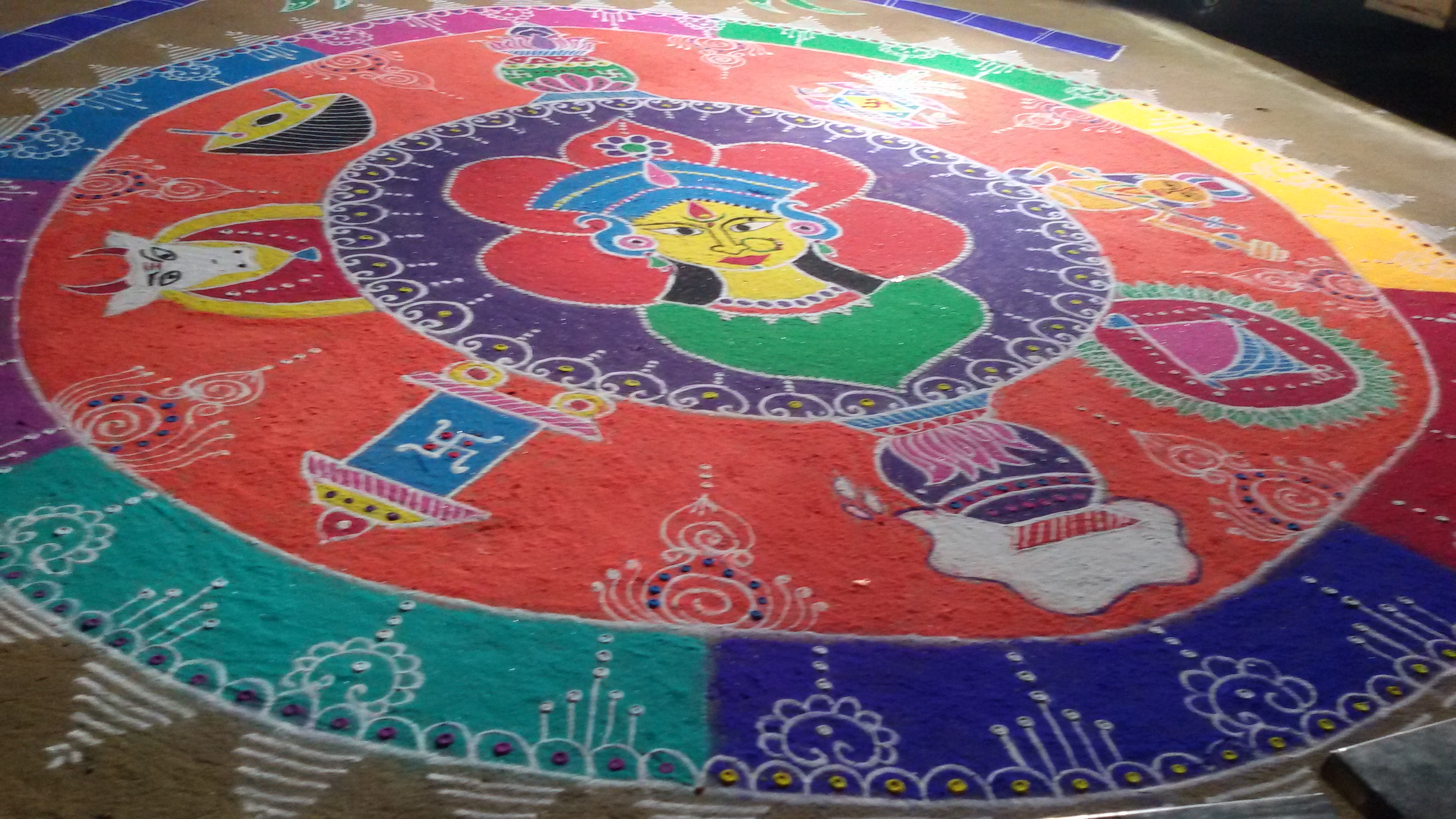
A rangoli made in front of a house

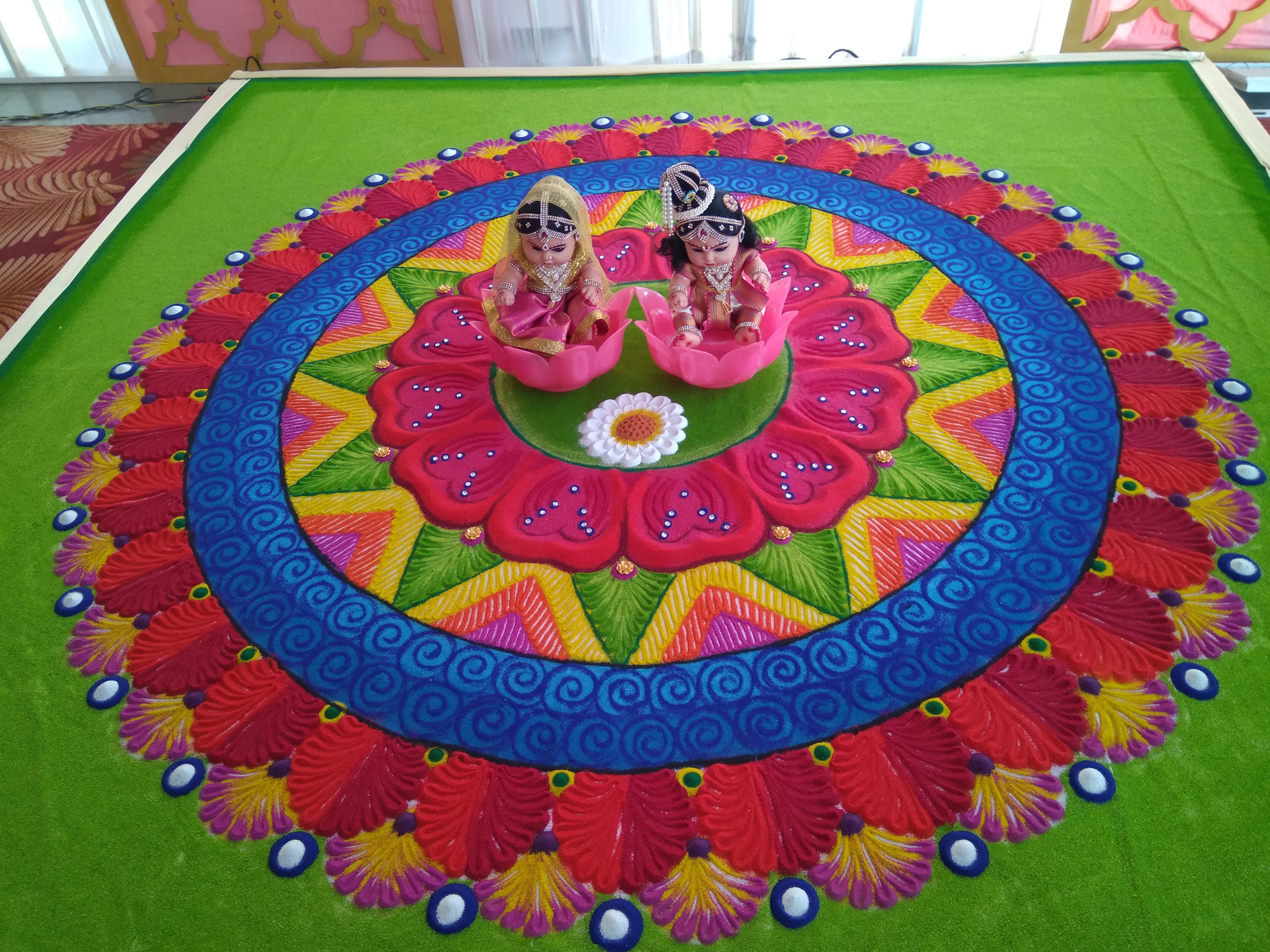
A rangoli is decorated with an idol of Krishna and Radha

== See also ==
- Chowk poorana – Folk art tradition from Northwest India
- Jhoti chita – Traditional Odia art
- Kalampattu – Traditional Hindu Performing Art in India
- Kolam/Muggu – South Indian form of drawing on the ground using rice flour
- Kuberakolam – Household symbolism in Hinduism
- Sand painting – Form of art creation
