= Kaal Bhairav Jayanti =

Festival in Hinduism dedicated to Kaal Bhairav

Kaal Bhairav Jayanti is an important festival in Hinduism dedicated to Kaal Bhairav, an avatar of Shiva. The festival is celebrated to protect oneself from evil energies, make oneself free from any dangers or unnatural death, and to protect oneself from unnatural events. Kaal Bhairav Jayanti which falls every year on the eighth day of the Agrahayana, the ninth month of the Hindu lunar calendar.

== Legend ==
As per Hindu scriptures there was once a debate between Vishnu and Brahman on the topic of greatest and powerful being. The debate took the form of argument which resulted in Shiva intervening to mediate for a resolution which was rejected by Brahma. Brahma rejected the resolution and insisted that he was the greatest as he had five heads. Shiva got angry after hearing the argument and Kaal Bhairav form was formed from Shiva's forehead, and then cut off one of the heads of Brahma. This made Brahma to realise and regret his mistake and all the gods requested Shiva to become calm and return to his original form.

== Offerings ==
During Kaal Bhairav Jayanti, devotees offer the following:

- Semolina Halwa or Soojhi ka Halwa
- Meetha or Sweet Rott
- Milk
- Liquor
- Black Gram or Kala Channa

== Donation ==
During Kaal Bhairav Jayanti, devotees donate the following:

- Mustard oil
- Black sesame seeds
- Black clothes
- Food to dogs
- Items made of iron or steel
- Gud or jaggery and Black Gram
- Charity to the needy

== See also ==
- Krishna Janmashtami
