= Swastika Lake =

Lake in Wyoming

- Location within Wyoming
- Location: Albany County, Wyoming
- Coordinates: 41°20′41″N 106°13′47″W
- Type: lake
- Basin countries: United States
- Surface area: 12 acres (4.9 ha)
- Surface elevation: 10,066 ft (3,068 m)

Swastika Lake is a lake in Albany County, Wyoming, in the United States. The lake is located in the Medicine Bow – Routt National Forest near the Libby Creek hiking trail.
