= Swastik Rangoli Kalakar Group =

Swastik Rangoli Kalakar Group is a Vadodara (Gujarat) based group formed in 1985 by rangoli enthusiasts who decided to work collectively and promote this almost forgotten traditional Indian art. The group holds various exhibitions in Vadodara and around. Their most popular exhibition is the annual Diwali exhibition. Since 1993, the group has been showcasing the rangolis at Kirti Mandir, which is a cenotaph of the royal family of Gaekkwads. Ranjitsinh Pratapsinh Gaekwad, the then titular king of Vadodara provided permission to the group to host the annual Diwali exhibition. In 2013, the exhibition was held at Maharaja Sayajirao University of Baroda since Kirti Mandir was undergoing repair works. That year, the group created the scene of Lanka Dahan from the epic Ramayana, with real fire. In 2020, due to COVID-19 pandemic, the annual exhibition was held online where artists drew the rangolis in their own homes.
