= Kuberakolam =

Household symbolism in Hinduism

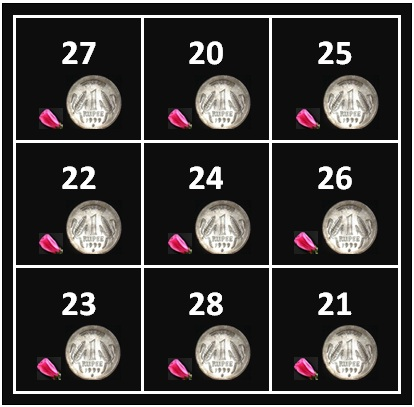
Image of a kuberakolam

A kuberakolam, rendered kubera kolam, is a magic square of order three constructed using rice flour and drawn on the floors of several houses in South India. In Hindu mythology, Kubera is a god of riches and wealth. It is believed that if one worships the Kuberakolam as ordained in the scriptures, one would be rewarded with wealth and prosperity.

A kolam is a drawing composed of lines and loops, drawn around a grid pattern of dots. In many places in South India, this form of art is drawn using rice powder/chalk/chalk powder and coloured powders.

== Construction ==
The Kubera kolam magic square is formed by the numbers 20, 21, 22, 23, 24, 25, 26, 27, 28 in the arrangement depicted below:

27	20	25
22	24	26
23	28	21

In this magic square, the numbers in each row, and in each column, and the numbers in the forward and backward main diagonals, all add up to the same number, namely, 72. To construct the Kubera kolam, the lines are drawn first. The numbers are then written in the following order: 24, 28, 23, 22, 27, 20, 25, 26, 21 in that order. A coin and a flower are usually placed in each cell.

== In literature ==
The Lost Symbol, a 2009 novel written by American writer Dan Brown, contains a brief reference to Kubera kolam.

== In science ==
Attempts have been made to use the Kubera kolam to introduce randomization in image steganography.
