= Mount Halo =

Mountain in Oregon

- Swastika Mountain
- Location within Oregon

Highest point
- Elevation: 4,197 ft (1,279 m) NAVD 88
- Prominence: 160 ft (49 m)
- Coordinates: 43°41′32″N 122°36′12″W

Geography
- Location: Lane County, Oregon, U.S.
- Topo map: USGS Holland Point

Mount Halo (previously known as Swastika Mountain) is a summit in Lane County, Oregon, in the United States. It is located within Umpqua National Forest.

The mountain took its previous name from the extinct town of Swastika (1909), which was reportedly so named because a rancher there branded his cattle with the image of a swastika.

A fire lookout tower stood atop Mount Halo until the 1950s.

In August 2022, the Oregon Geographic Names Board confirmed that the name of the mountain would be changed from Swastika Mountain, to avoid association with the Nazi Party. Two proposals for a new name, "Umpqua Mountain" (referring to the national forest which the mountain is located in) and "Mount Halo" (referring to Chief Halito, leader of the Yoncalla Kalapuya tribe), were submitted. The name of Mount Halo was chosen on April 13, 2023.
