= Swastika epidemic of 1959–1960 =

Wave of anti-Jewish incidents between 1959 and 1960

The swastika epidemic of 1959–1960 was a wave of anti-Jewish incidents which happened at the end of 1959 to 1960 all around the world. In West Germany alone, 833 separate anti-Jewish acts were recorded between December 25, 1959, and mid-February 1960 by the authorities.

== Cologne incident and its spread ==
The symbolic and widely publicized incident of vandalism against the Roonstrasse Synagogue in Cologne, Germany happened on the morning of Christmas 1959. It was perpetrated by Arnold Strunk and Josef Schönen, members of far-right Deutsche Reichspartei.

On the night of December 30, a synagogue in Notting Hill, London was also defaced. Following that, other similar incidents occurred in Aximinster to York; five Jewish members of Parliament were threatened. In the United States, swastikas were painted, anti-Semitic slogans were displayed and Jewish property were attacked. Later, similar incidents spread to about 34 countries. In the U.S., the Anti-Defamation League of B'nai B'rith reported approximately 637 discrete incidents in 236 cities, which ranges from the construction and display of swastikas (84%), mail, telephone or personal threats (11%) to physical damage (5%). 20 percent of the targets are public school, library and college buildings. Numerous episodes also occurred in Italy, where a lively debate developed on the historical responsibilities of fascism. In France, several hundred swastikas were counted across the country. On January 10, a march of 30,000 Parisians took place in front of the Memorial to the Unknown Jewish Martyr (now part of the Shoah Memorial). The call to participate had been issued by, among others, the MRAP, the CRIF, the International League Against Anti-Semitism (LICA), the League for Human Rights, the CGT, and the CFTC.

== Response ==
Then German chancellor Konrad Adenauer called his cabinet to emergency meeting and passed a law against Volksverhetzung, or hate crimes against ethnic groups. In West Berlin, 40,000 people marched against anti-Semitism. Willy Brandt, then mayor of Berlin, Pinchas Rosen, the Israeli Minister of Justice and White House all expressed their concern and opposition.

In Britain, incidents targeting German employees and German products were reported.

In France, various newspapers reported on the swastika epidemic, with Le Monde characterizing it as an international phenomenon, Le Figaro primarily as a German problem, the communist L'Humanité as an expression of persistent Nazism in Germany, and the far-right Rivarol as a communist smear campaign from the East.

== Involvement of East Germany ==
At that time, a Communist conspiracy was suspected. The British intelligence community released directives sent from Moscow to its agents, suggesting that Moscow was highly likely behind what had happened around the world.
