= Jhoti chita =

Traditional Odia art

Jhoti Chita
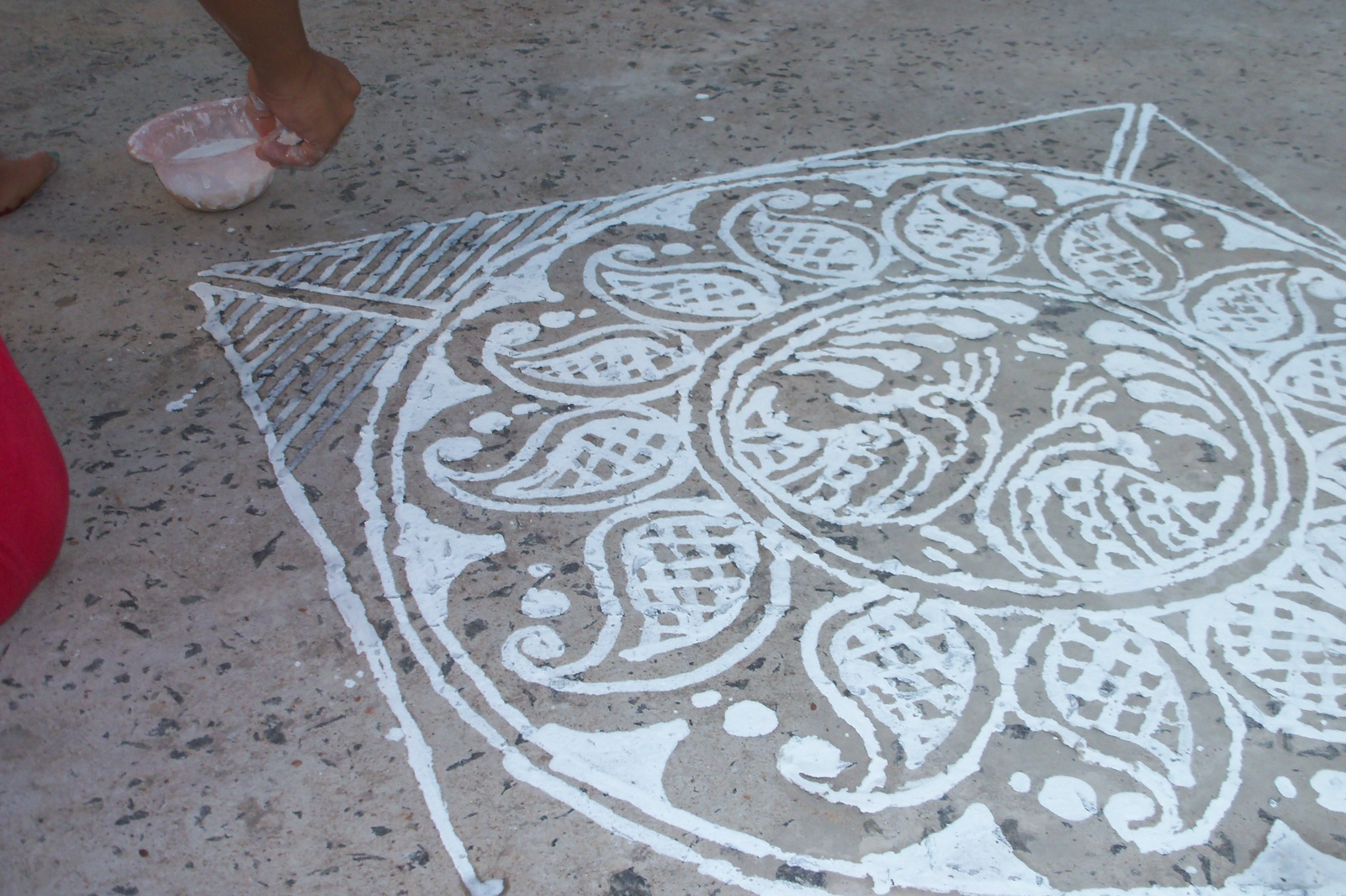
- Type: Odia art
- Medium: rice paste

Jhoti chita (Odia: ଝୋଟି ଚିତା, romanized: jhōṭi citā) is a traditional Odia white art mostly seen in rural areas of Odisha. It is made from rice paste and with a piece of cloth surrounded with a stick is used to create beautiful patterns. People also use their bare fingers to make jhoti chita. They can be created over walls and on floors.

Jhoti chitas are created for various festivals like marriage, Manabasa Gurubara and Raja.

The traditional of jhoti chita has been utilized used to make sari prints.
