= Shekaripuram =

Shekharipuram ശേഖരിപുരം
- Neighborhood
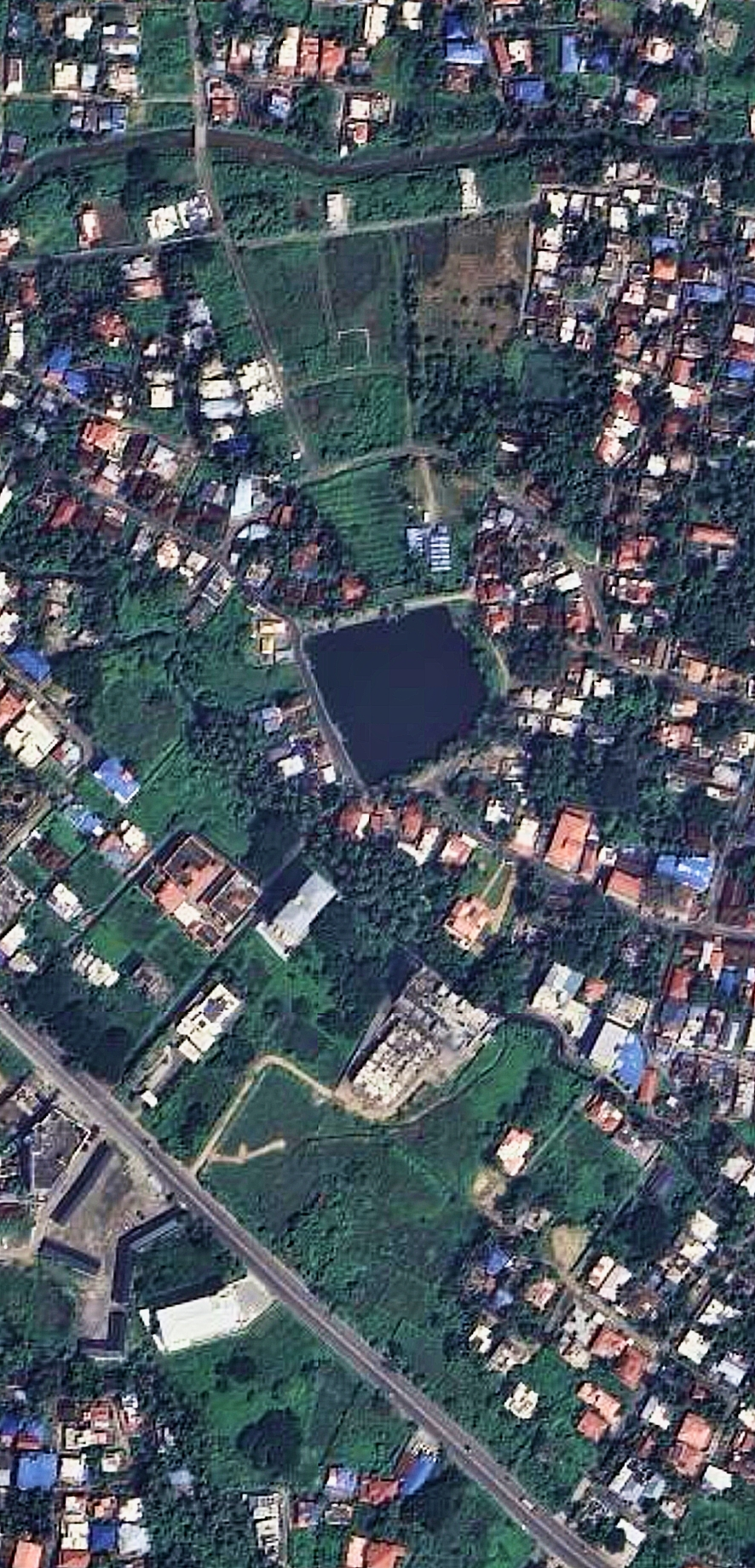
- Aerial view of Sekharipuram village

- Location in Kerala, India Shekharipuram (India)
- Coordinates: 10°47′21″N 76°39′17″E
- Country: India
- State: Kerala
- District: Palakkad

Government
  - Type: Local government
  - Body: Palakkad Municipality

Languages
  - Official: Malayalam, English
  - Regional: Malayalam, Tamil
- Time zone: UTC+5:30 (IST)
- PIN: 678010
- Vehicle registration: KL-09

Shekharipuram (also spelled Sekharipuram) is a residential area in Palakkad, in the Indian state of Kerala. Sekharipuram is famous for its agraharam (heritage village). The Calicut bypass road which starts from Sekharipuram is a four lane bypass road constructed for the vehicles coming from other parts of Kerala going towards Tamil Nadu side by bypassing Palakkad town.

Sekharipuram is arguably the oldest of all the eighteen villages in palakkad town. History indicates that several hundred years ago a large number of Tamil Brahmins from Thanjavur, Trichy and Kumbakonam migrated via Madurai and Pollachi and settled in Palakkad and established the 108 agraharams of the district, of which 18 are in the Palakkad town. Each of these villages has a temple as the nucleus and several streets consisting of row houses with common walls for adjacent houses.

One of them is the agraharam of Sekharipuram, which lies adjacent to another famous Tamil agraharam, Kalpathy.

Sekharipuram consists of five large streets with five temples. The main temple is that of the presiding deity Lord Lakshminarayana with Bhoomi Devi and Lakshmi Devi. Other temples are those of Lord Mahaganapathy, Lord Hariharaputhra, Lord Shiva, and Goddess Emoor Bhagavathi.

== Temples ==
- Lakshminarayana Swamy Temple
- Bala Ganapathi Temple
- Hariharaputhra Swamy Temple
- Emoor Bhagavathi Temple
- Viswanatha Swamy Temple

== Festivals ==
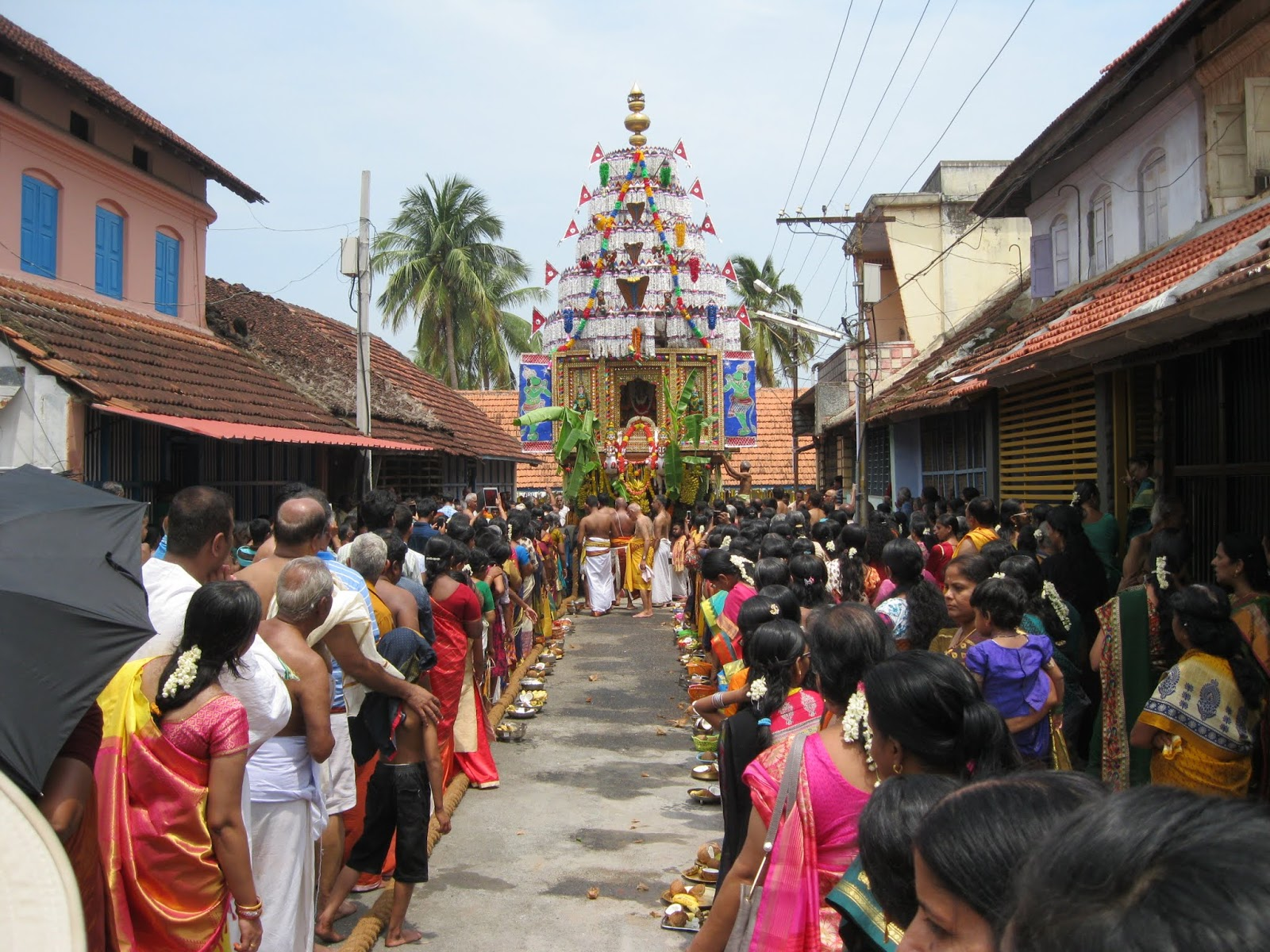
Sekharipuram ratholsavam

The Chariot (Theru) Festival occurs during the month of May. This is not to be confused with the Kalpathy Ratholsavam, which occurs separately during the month of November.

A major Mahakumbabishekam festival is held every 12 years in the village, the last one being held in May 2007 at the Lakshminarayan Temple.V. R. Krishna Iyer (1915–2014) one of India's most influential judges, jurists, and legal reformers was born in this village.

== Pictures ==
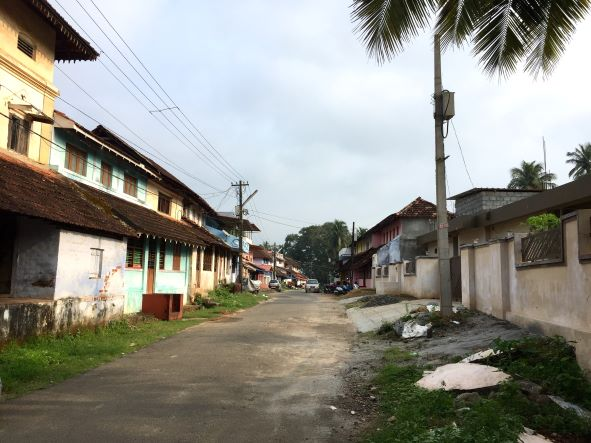
Street of Sekharipuram village

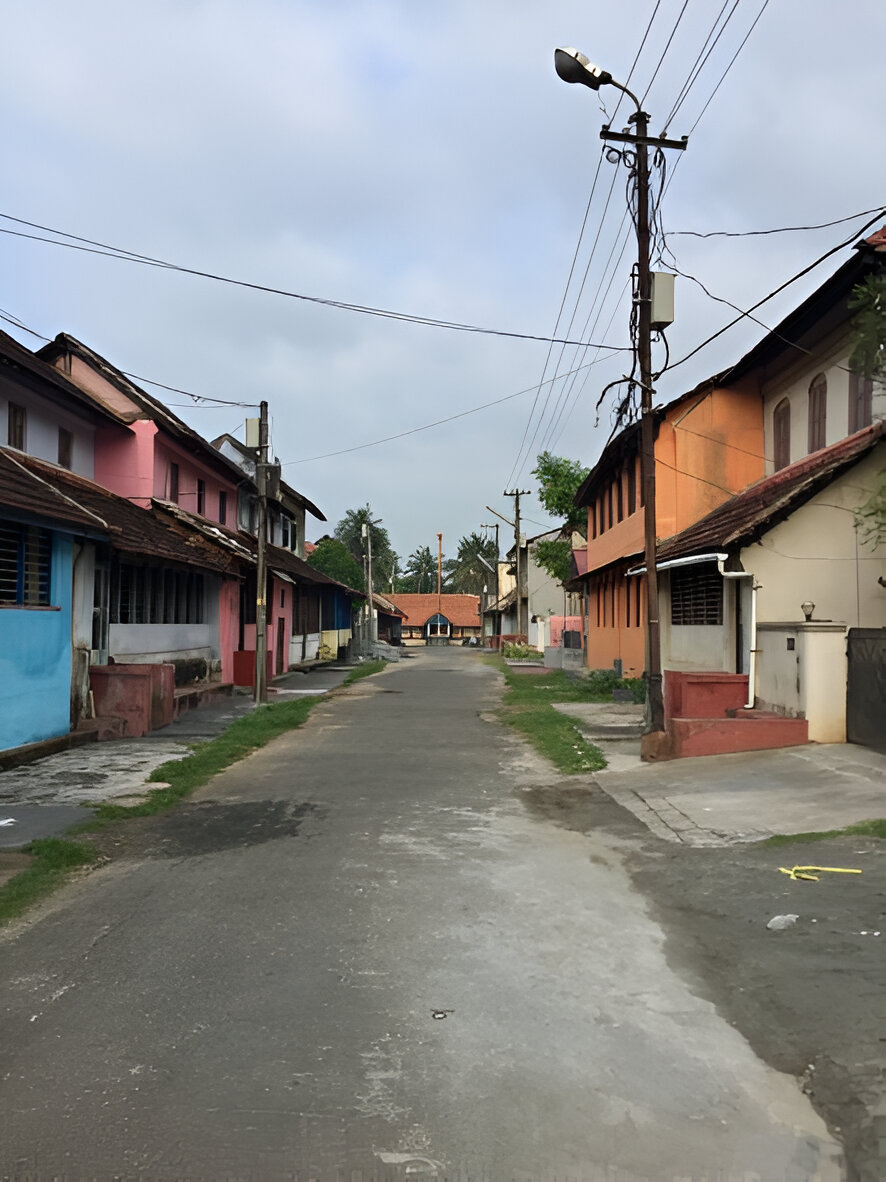
Street of Sekharipuram village

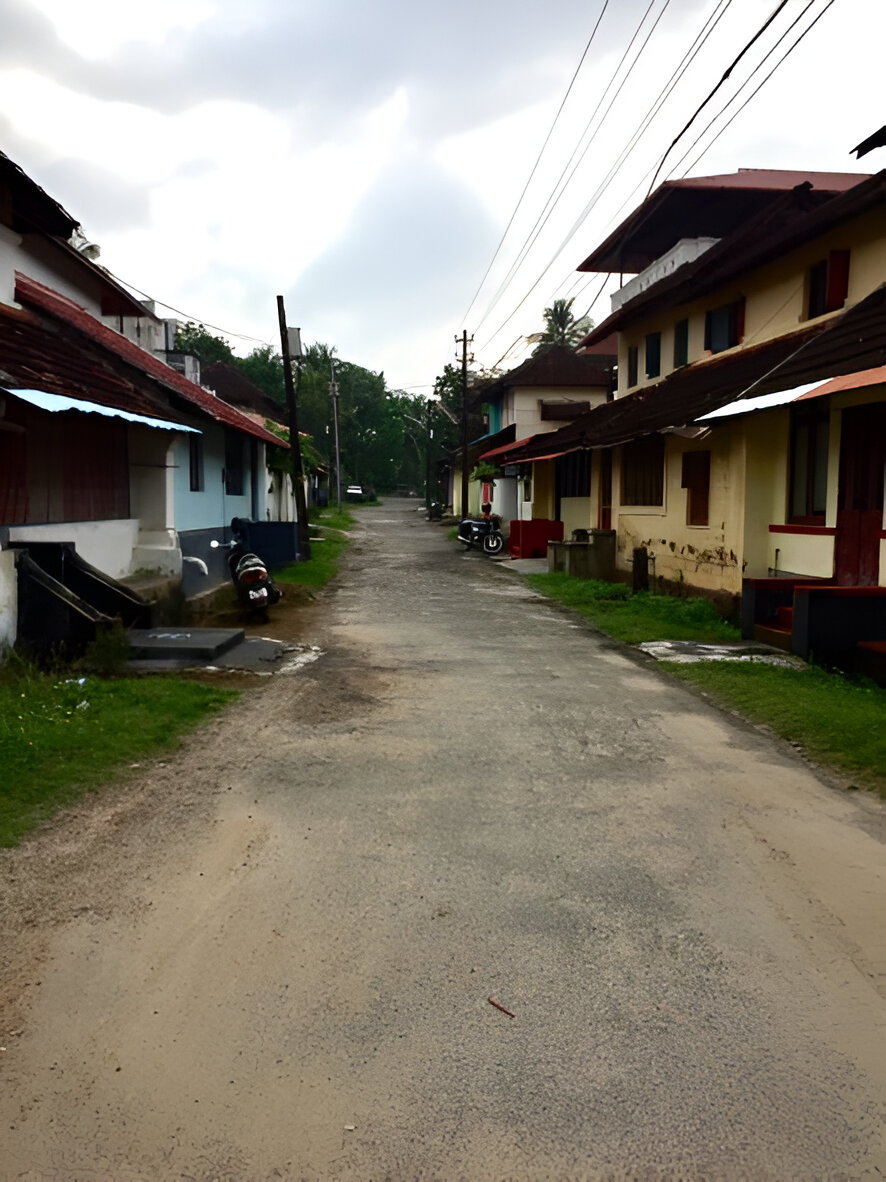
Street of Sekharipuram village
