= Viswanatha Swamy Temple =

Viswanatha Swamy Temple, Palakkad
- Viswanatha Swamy Temple, Kalpathy, Palakkad, Kerala

Religion
- Affiliation: Hinduism
- District: Palakkad
- Deity: Vishwanathar(Shiva ) Vishalakshi(parvathi)
- Festival: Maha Shivaratri Kalpathi Ratholsavam

Location
- Location: Kalpathy
- State: Kerala
- Country: India
- Interactive map of Viswanatha Swamy Temple, Palakkad
- Coordinates: 10.794928°N 76.647908°E

Architecture
- Type: Architecture of Kerala

Specifications
- Temple: One
- Elevation: 101.5 m (333 ft)

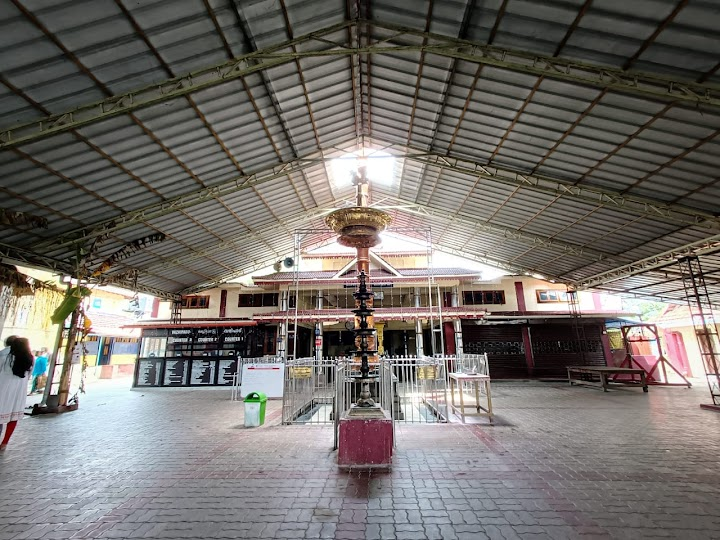
Viswanatha Swamy temple, New Kalpathy

Sri Visalakshi Sametha Sri Viswanatha Swamy temple, popularly known as Kasi Viswanathaswamy Temple, or locally as Kundukovil, is a famous Hindu temple located in the Kalpathy village of Palakkad in Kerala, India.

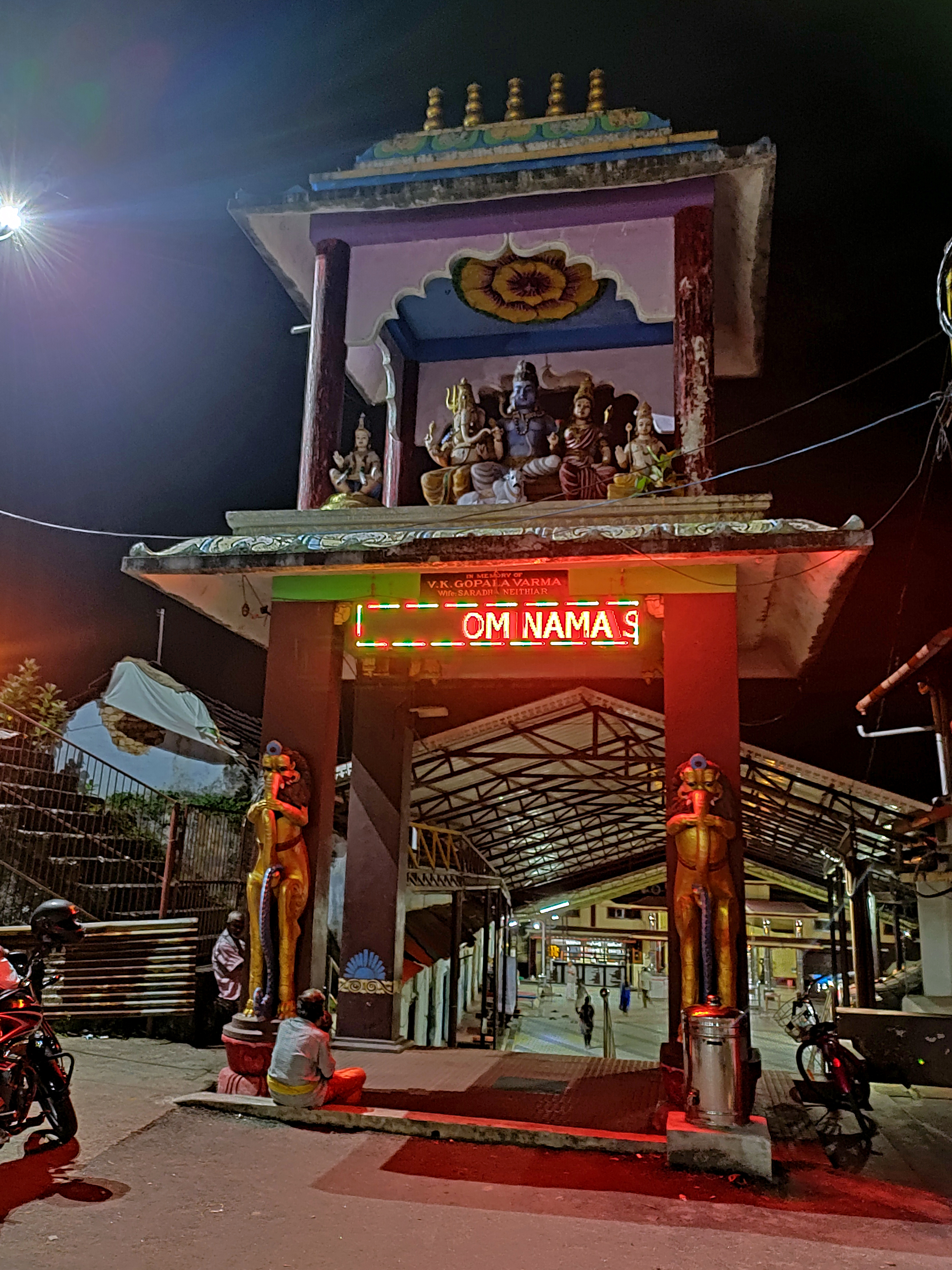
Viswanatha Swamy Temple Entrance

It is the main site of the annual Kalpathi Ratholsavam which is one of the most famous temple festivals of Kerala. This ancient temple nestles by the banks of the serene Kalpathy river (Nila Nadhi). Dedicate to Lord Siva and his consort Visalakshi (another name for Parvati), it dates back to early fifteenth century. The similarity to the Varanasi Kashi Viswanatha temple on the banks of Ganges is responsible for the moniker kasiyil paathi kalpathy and the name Dakshina Kashi associated with this temple. The Temple is surrounded by the four Tamil Brahmin agraharams or traditional villages: New Kalpathy, Old Kalpathy, Chathapuram and Govindarajapuram.

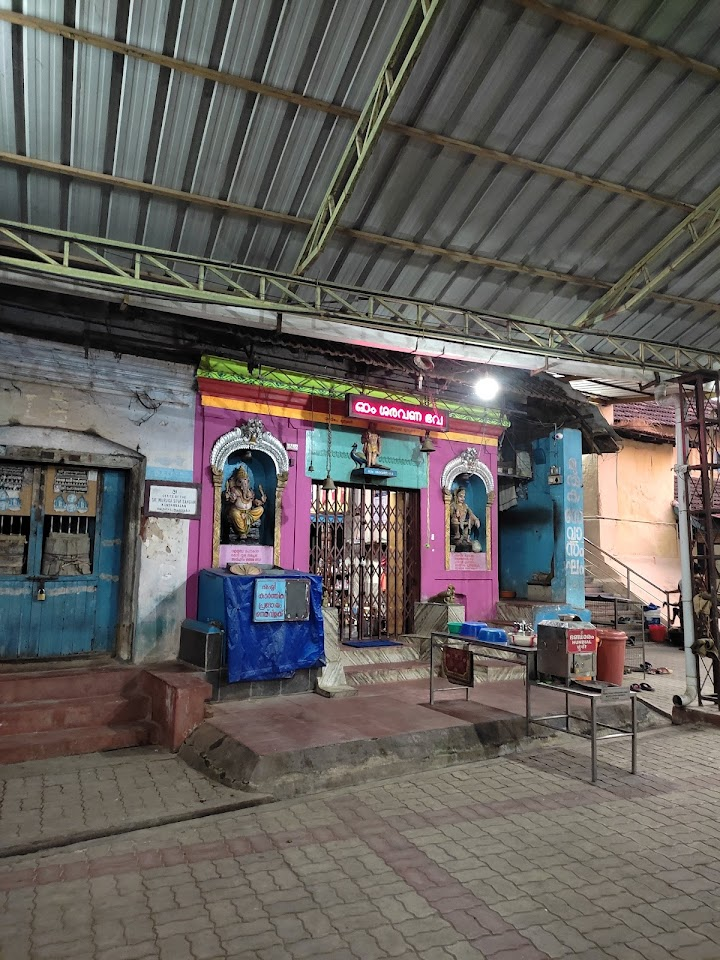
Muruga temple within the premises of Viswanatha Swamy temple

== Antiquity and history ==
There is an inscription in kolezhuthu on a stone slab placed in front of the temple between the flag staff and the Nandi Mandapam, outside the temple, but within the temple courtyard. This inscription records some endowments made by one Ittikombi Achan, member of the royal family of Palakkad in Malayalam Era 600 [1424–25 AD]. Evidently the temple must have been founded earlier than that.

The villagers, however, claim that the temple was consecrated at the instance of one Lakshmi Ammal, a Brahmin wife of Venkitanarayanaiyer of Kollengode. They are reported to have brought the Siva Lingam from Kasi (Varanasi) during one of her visits to that holy place and desired to construct a temple and install the Lingam. On reaching Kalpathy, she along with her husband and with the help of the then King of Palakkad Installed the Siva Lingam in Kalpathy and the idol is very powerful in blessing all, by showering all prosperities especially to Business community. The temple is on the banks of Nila River. Villagers believe that she approached the then Raja (Prince) of Palakkad with this request, who had readily agreed and constructed the temple. It is also said that Lakshmi Ammal had given the Prince 1320 gold coins and entrusted him with the responsibility of managing the temple affairs. A record to this effect kept on the palm leaves is believed to have been lost during the time of one Somasundara Kurukkal, who was the priest of the temple at that time. According to depositions by Sri Somasundara Kurukkal, it is believed that the Prince who Lakshmi Ammal approached was Ittilkombi Achan. Sri Somasundara Kurukkal has also confirmed that the Prince had entrusted the management of the temple to his descendants belonging to the Valia Konikkal Madom. The Prince had also donated land for the upkeep and maintenance of the temple. The lands set apart for this temple came to be made inam or revenue-free by him and this was allowed to be continued as revenue free by the subsequent rulers, Tipu Sultan and later by the British Government. Even today the management of the temple continues to be in the hands of the Trustee, a descendant of the erstwhile princely family. Lakshmi Ammal also constructed three other temples in nearby Kollengode, Koduvayur and Pokkunni. Naturally she installed lingams brought from Varanasi. They are Brahmin (in kollengode) Ksahtriya (Koduvayur) Sudra ( Pokkunni in Kollengode).

The land reforms of the Government of recent times had deprived the temple of the income from these lands. The Temple at present is being run by the offerings of the devotees and vazhipadu collections. The first face of the inscription on the granite slab in front of the Temple contains the details of the lands given as gift to the temple with the four boundaries thereof. The agraharam sites of the four streets of Old Kalpathy, New Kalpathy, Chathapuram and Govindarajapuram are all included within the boundaries of the lands given, as described in the stone inscription. It is clear from this that the Brahmin houses in the four agraharams were in existence on the date of the gift mentioned in the stone inscription.

== Structural location and layout ==
The temple is situated at the bottom of eighteen steps leading from the eastern Gopuram. In the south-west direction of the temple is situated the temple of Sri Lakshminarayana Perumal of Old Kalpathy Village and Prasanna Maha Ganapathy of Chathapuram village, in the east the Kshipraprasada Maha Ganapathi Temple of Pandhrandaam Teruvu and the Manthakara Maha Ganapathi Temple of New Kalpathy village and in the east–west direction Sri Varadaraja Perumal of Govindarajapuram village. In the eastern direction at a distance of a kilometer is located the Chokkanathar temple of Chokkanathapuram village. On the right side while entering the temple, there are two banyan trees. The Serpent Gods [nagaprathishta] are consecrated beneath the first banyan tree, which is also the "sthala Vriksham". Pooja is performed for this tree and naga prathishta, treating it as "Vishnu Amsom".

The flag staff (Kodimaram) is erected in front of the temple. The stone slab describing the land given to the temple etc. is installed behind the flag mast. Close to the stone slab is the Bhadralingam and in front of it the Gnana Nandikeswarar, facing Sri Viswanathaswamy. The eight sides of the prakaram(closed precincts of a temple) inside the Temple belongs to Indra, Agni, Yama, Niruruthi, Varuna, Vayu, Kubera, and Eesanan. The idol of Sri Viswanathaswamy is situated in the direction of Kubera facing east and close to this Sri Visalakshi facing south. In front of Sri Viswanathaswamy, Nandikeswarar appears in three forms. The three forms symbolise Aathmathathwam, Vidyathathwam and Sivathathwam. The moolavar in this temple is Sri Viswanathaswami.

== Pooja Vidhi (religious services) ==
The idols of Sri Viswanathaswamy and Sri Visalakshi are attached to the pedestals by Ashtabandhanam, a mixture of eight elements that help fix the idol to the peetham or base. The Viswanathaswamy idol is a Bana Lingam. The Bana lingam extends four carpenter's angul (inch) higher than the pedestal. The circumference at the level of the pedestal may be about eight angul(inches). The Vishalakshi idol stands twenty four inches above the pedestal up to the top of the crown.

Pooja in temples are of two types: aathmartham and parartham. The two differ in the sankalpam. In the former, the sankalpam will be in the name of yajamana of the temple i.e. udamasthan or owner. In the latter the sankalpam will be in the name of all people. In the Sri Viswanathaswamy temple, the pooja performed is aathmartham. The pooja in the temple is conducted on the pattern of the pooja held in the Mayuranathar Temple at Mayiladuthurai (formerly known as Mayavaram). Sri Subramania Kurukkal of Mayiladuthurai was the first poojakar (priest). The pooja is conducted according to the Tamil Agama. There are 28 types of Agamas. The pooja in this temple is being followed according to Kamikagamam. Pooja is conducted four times a day: 5:45AM Usha Pooja, 9:45 AM Uchikala Pooja, 5:45 PM Deeparadhana, and 7:45 PM Ardhajama Pooja. The Ardhajama pooja is most important. It includes dhara and Abhishekam by milk daily. Performing Umamaheswara Pooja which costs ₹80/-is said to be of great value because both Lord Siva and Goddess Parvathy are said to be pleased by the Pooja if properly performed.

== Recent news ==
According to sastras, renovation and Kumbhabhishekham of temples are to be conducted once in twelve years in order to enhance the divine power of the Lord. The last Jeernodharanam and Kumbhabhishekham of this temple were conducted in 1956 and 1981, respectively. Thus, it has been more than 30 years since major repairs have been undertaken.

The temple structure including the Garbhagrihams (sanctum sanctorum) has developed extensive damages and they require immediate attention to prevent further damages. Even though efforts were on for undertaking the repair works for the last several years, due to some reason or other they have not yielded the desired result. Now some serious efforts are on to undertake the work of Jeernodharanam to be followed by Maha Kumbhabhishekam ritual in order to enhance the divine power of the Lord. Sri K. Krishnan Embrandiri, Charactered Engineer and a renowned Temple Architect well-versed in vasthu shastras, was entrusted with the work of preparing the Renovation Project. He has prepared the estimates for the civil works connected with the Development/Renovation Project. Based on the project report of civil works involved and taking into consideration the expenditure involved for conducting the vedic rituals, veda parayanam, cultural events etc., an estimate of about 100 lakhs (10 million) Rupees has been prepared.

The Department of Tourism of the Kerala Government recently launched a Heritage Protection project at Kalpathy to preserve not only this magnificent temple, but also the Brahmin agraharams around it.

== See also ==
- List of Hindu temples in Kerala
