= Kalpathi Ratholsavam =

Annual Hindu temple festival in South India

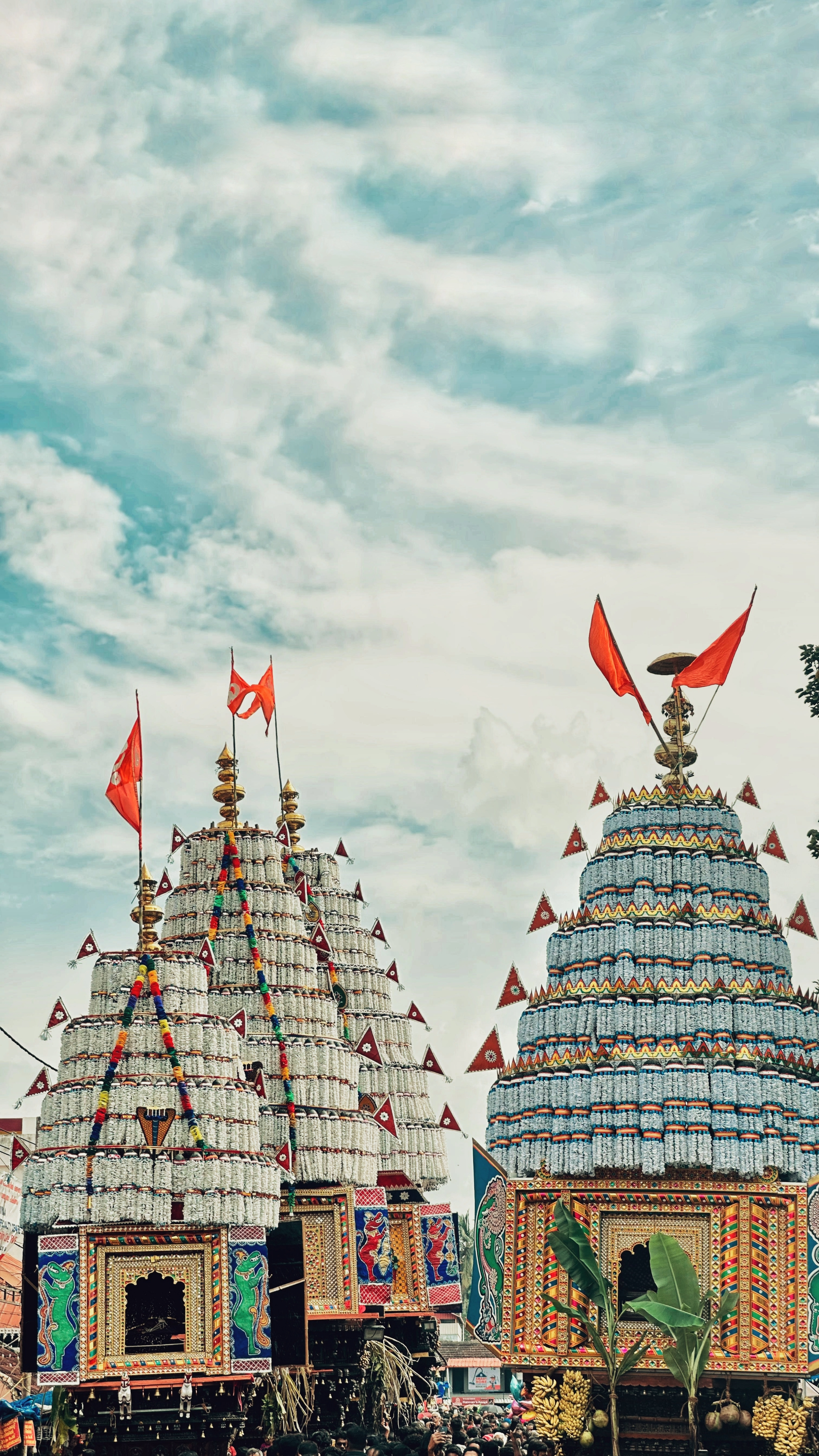
Chariots of the Kalpathy Ratholsavam

Kalpathy Ratholsavam (Kalpathy Car Festival) is an annual Hindu Temple festival in the village of Kalpathy, Palakkad, a district in the state of Kerala, India. The festival includes a locus of chariots from 4 different temples in Kalpathy, namely Sri Visalaksha Sametha Sri Viswanatha Swamy temple, Sri Lakshmi Narayana Perumal temple, Manthakkara Sree Mahaganapathy temple & Chathapuram Sri Prasanna Mahaganapathy temple.

Kalpathy Car Festival is based on vedic Tamil Brahmin culture. The main centre of the festival is Kalpathy Sree Viswanathaswamy temple. The three satellite temples in the villages of new Kalpathy, old Kalpathy and Chathapuram are also participants in the festival.

The festival also features a Carnatic music festival held at Mani Iyyer Road, Chathapuram and routines such as Unchavrithi and Pancharatna Keerthan Aalapan are performed. There are roadside stalls selling a wide variety of goods, including food and clothings.

== How to get there ==
- Nearest bus stand: Palakkad Stadium Bus Stand 3 km
- Nearest railway station: Palakkad Junction - 3 km
- Nearest airport: Coimbatore International Airport - 70 km

== The Festival ==
The annual ten-day chariot festival conducted here during the month of November(Malayalam month Thulam & Tamil month Aippasi) is one of the most remarkable festivals of Kerala. Also known as Kalpathy Theru(Kalpathy Chariot), Vedic recitals and cultural programmes are held in the temple during the first four days of the festival. The chariots are not brought on until the last three days of the festival. During the other days, the idols of the deities are decorated in different forms(such as Garuda vahana or Hanuman vahana for Lord Vishnu, & Mooshika(mouse) vahana for Lord Ganesha) and is carried through the streets in huge processions by the residents of the village, namely the Kalpathy Youngsters from the villages within Kalpathy, in either the support of bamboo shoots or in palanquins. This tradition is believed to be over 700 years old.

There's also the Anjaam Thirunaal(അഞ്ചാം തിരുനാൾ/Fifth Festival) which is the fifth day of the Ratholsavam where the deities are carried in processions in smaller chariots, and the big ones are only brought on in the last three days of the festival.

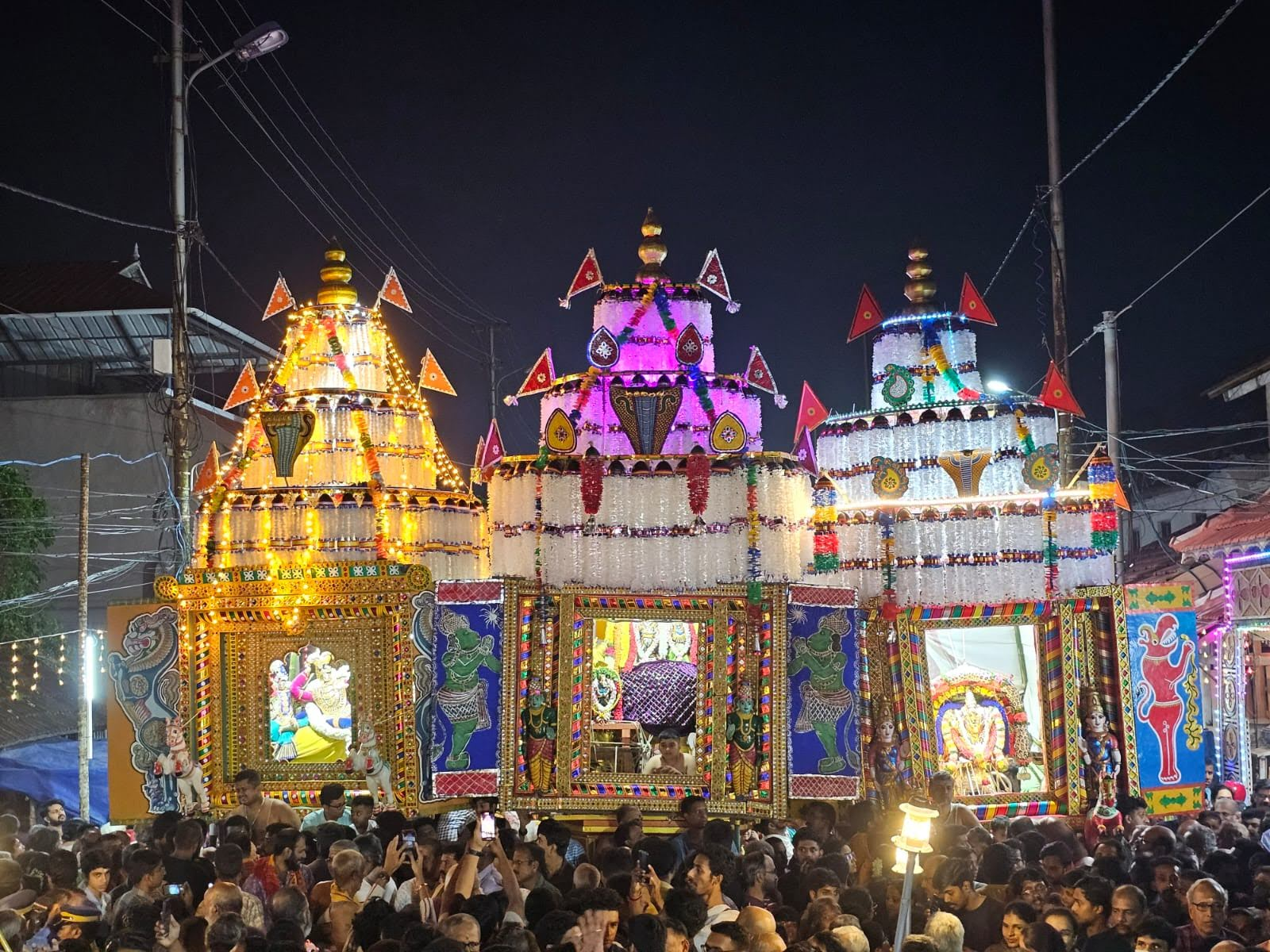
Anjaam Thirunaal(അഞ്ചാം തിരുനാൾ)(The fifth festival)

On the last three days, thousands of devotees gather together to draw decorated temple chariots through the streets.

6 chariots from 4 temples take part in the procession, namely the temples of Sri Visalakshi Sametha Viswanatha Swamy, Sri Lakshmi Narayana Perumal, Manthakkara Sree Mahaganapathy & Chathapuram Sri Prasanna Mahaganapathy.

Viswanatha Swamy temple owns three of the six chariots, which are of Lord Shiva & Parvati, Lord Ganesha, and the final one of Lord Muruga, who is the youngest of Lord Shiva's children and has the smallest chariot. The final three days of the festival are known as Onnam(First) Theru, Randam(Second) Theru & Munnam(Third) Theru respectively.

On the final day, all the chariots assemble in front of the Visalakshi Sametha Viswanatha Swamy temple, termed as the Devarathasangamam(Chariot Confluence). The point of meeting is also known as Therumutty(തേരുമുട്ടി). Thousands of devotees converge at Kalpathy and pull the chariot every year. The chants of Lord Shiva, Narayana & Hanuman while the ropes are drawn is an unmissable event.

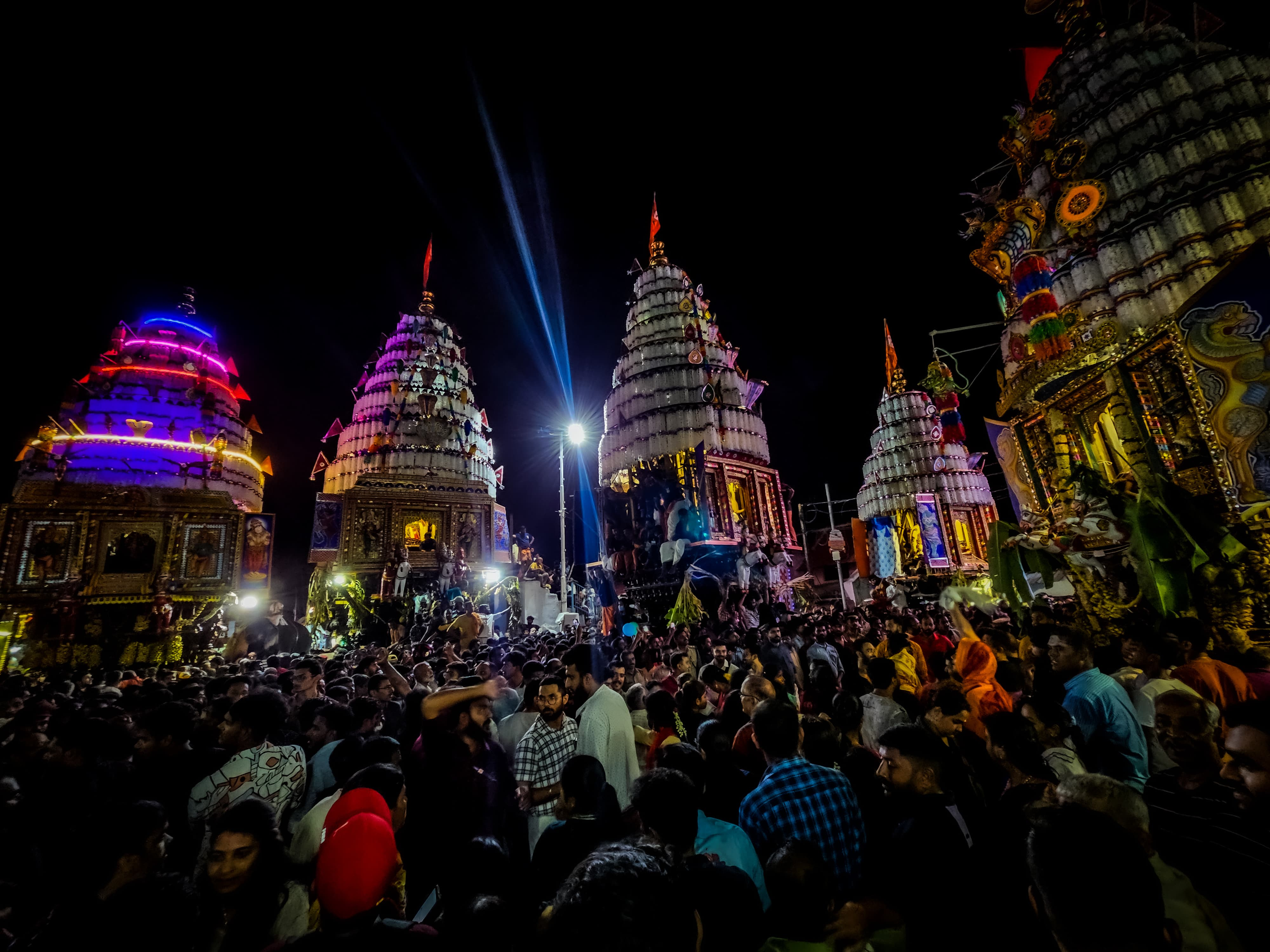
Devarathasangamam, or Chariot Confluence

== Pictures ==
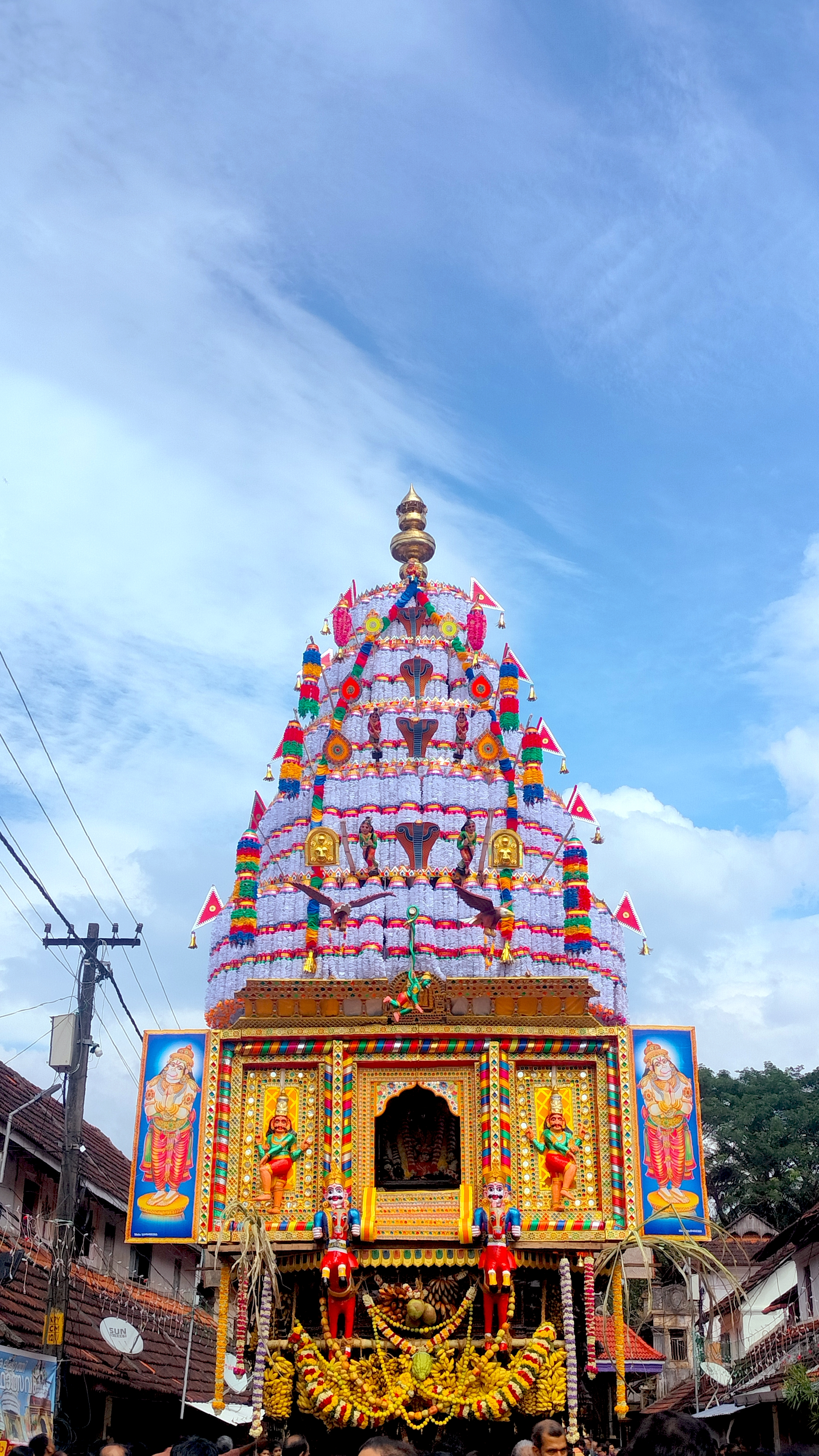
Kalpathy Ratholsavam chariot of Chathapuram

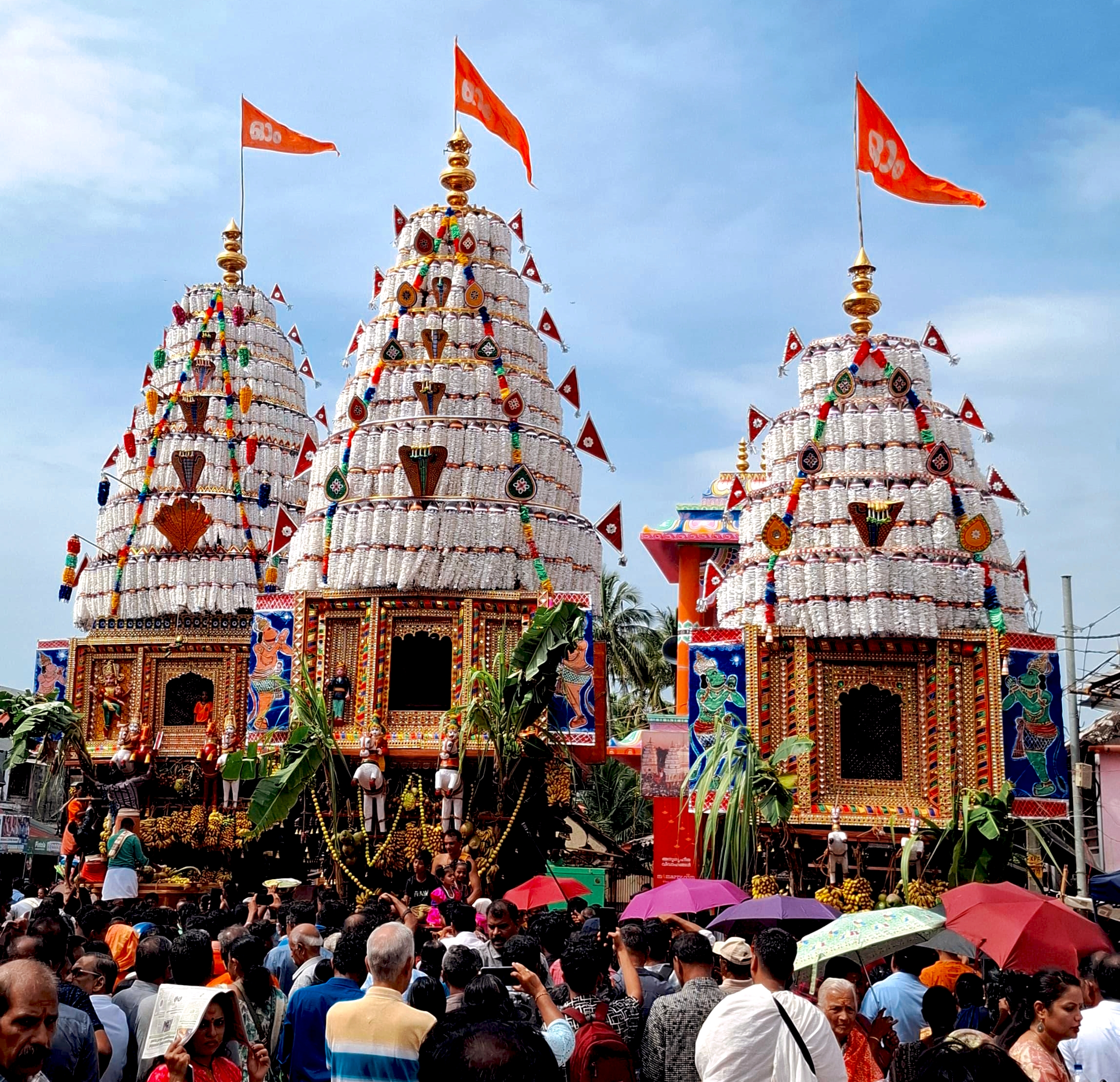
Three chariots of Lord Shiva, Ganesha & Kartikeya in the Kalpathy Ratholsavam

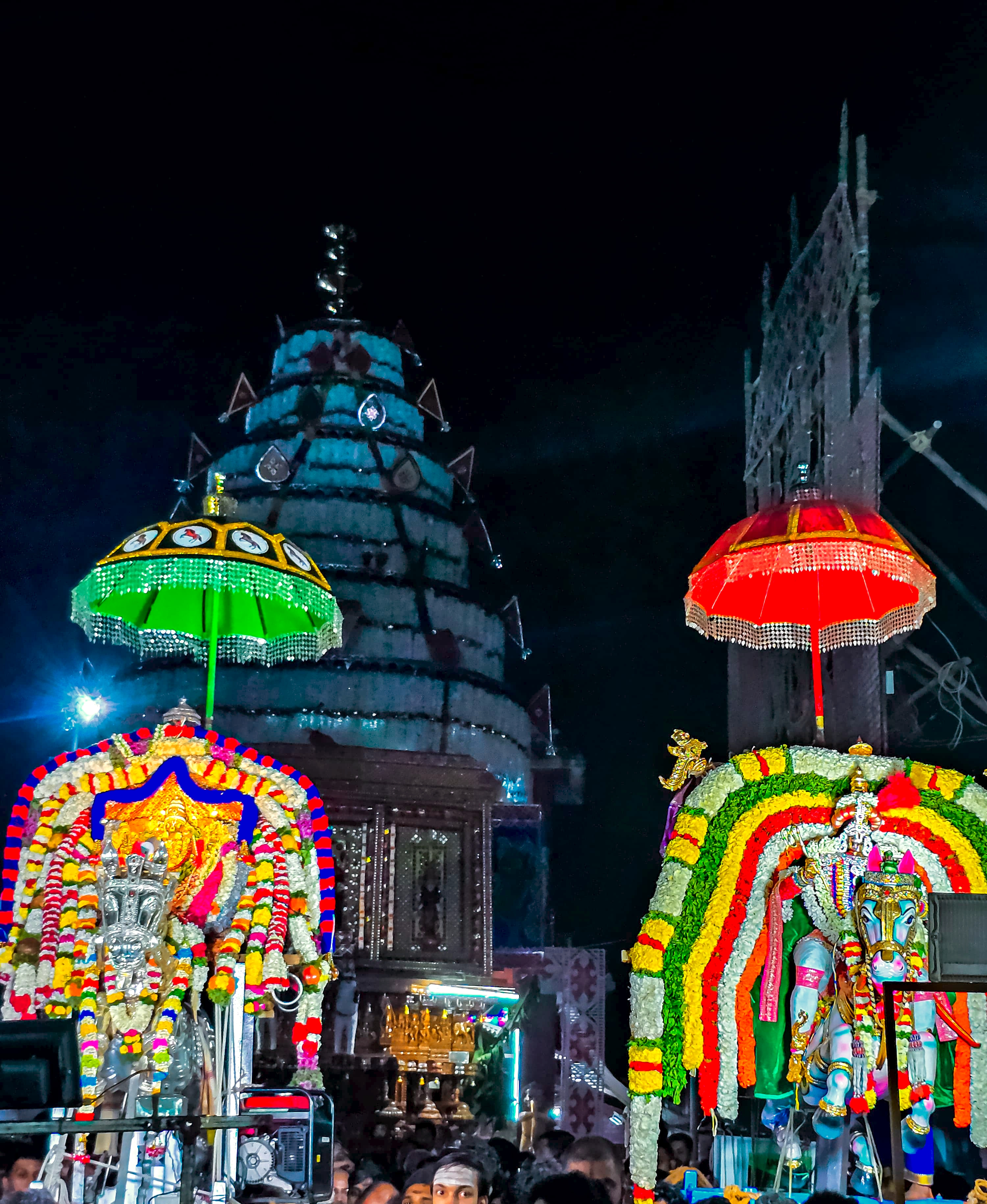
Horse vehicle decoration(കുതിര വാഹന അലങ്കാരം) of Lakshmi Narayana Perumal & Chathapuram Prasanna Ganapathi

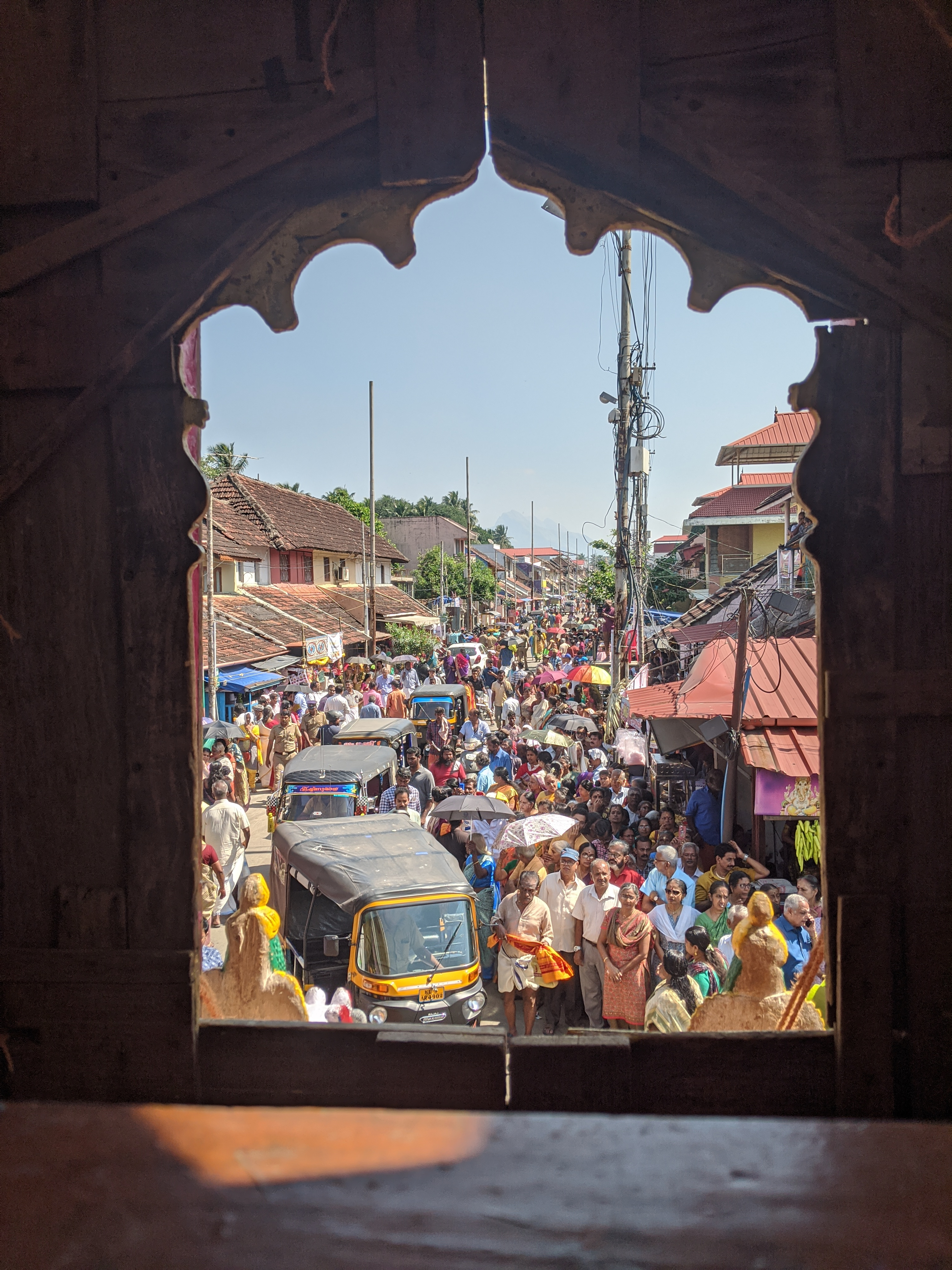
Inside the Kalpathy Ratholsavam chariot

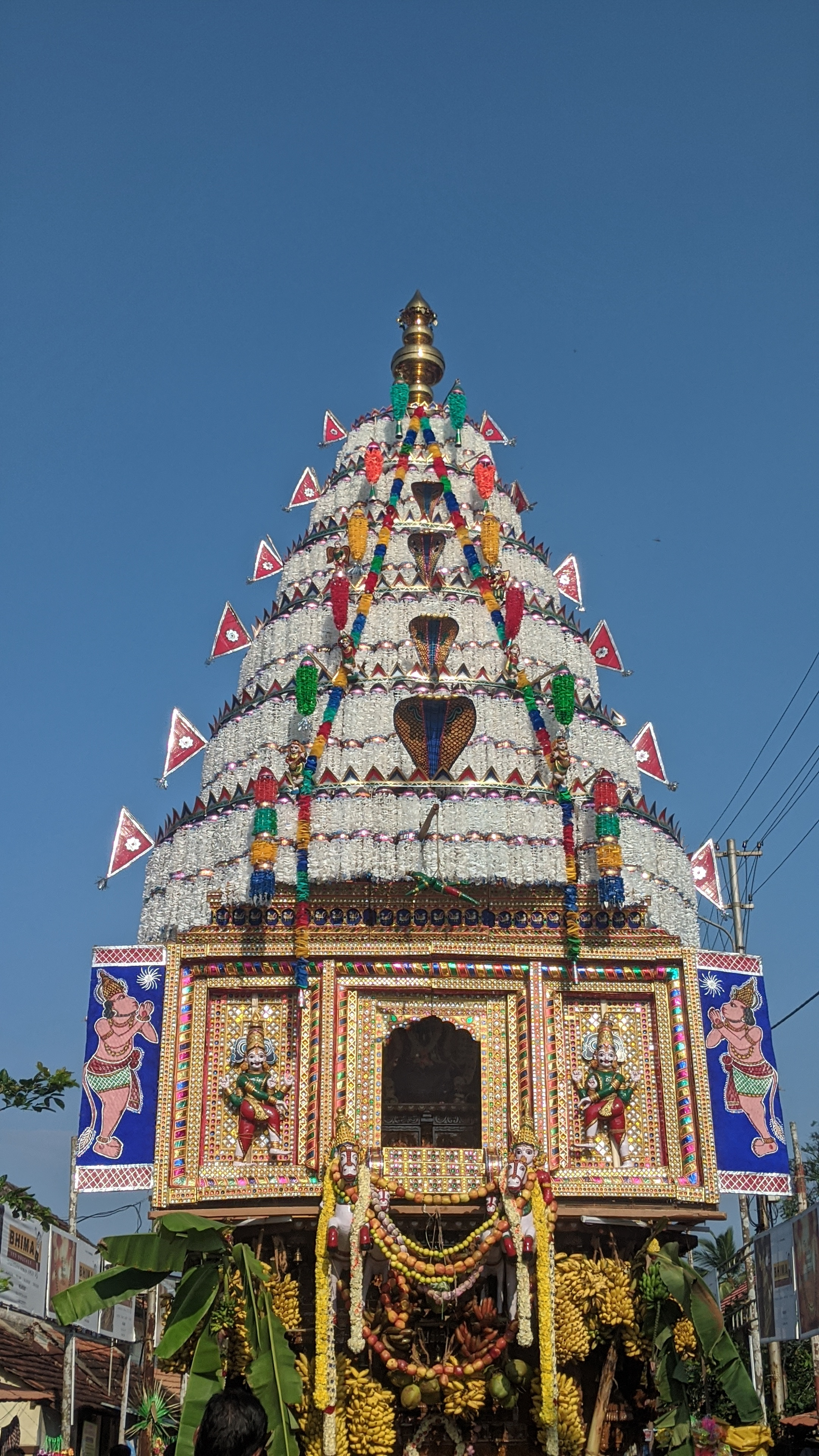
Chariot of the Kalpathy Ratholsavam

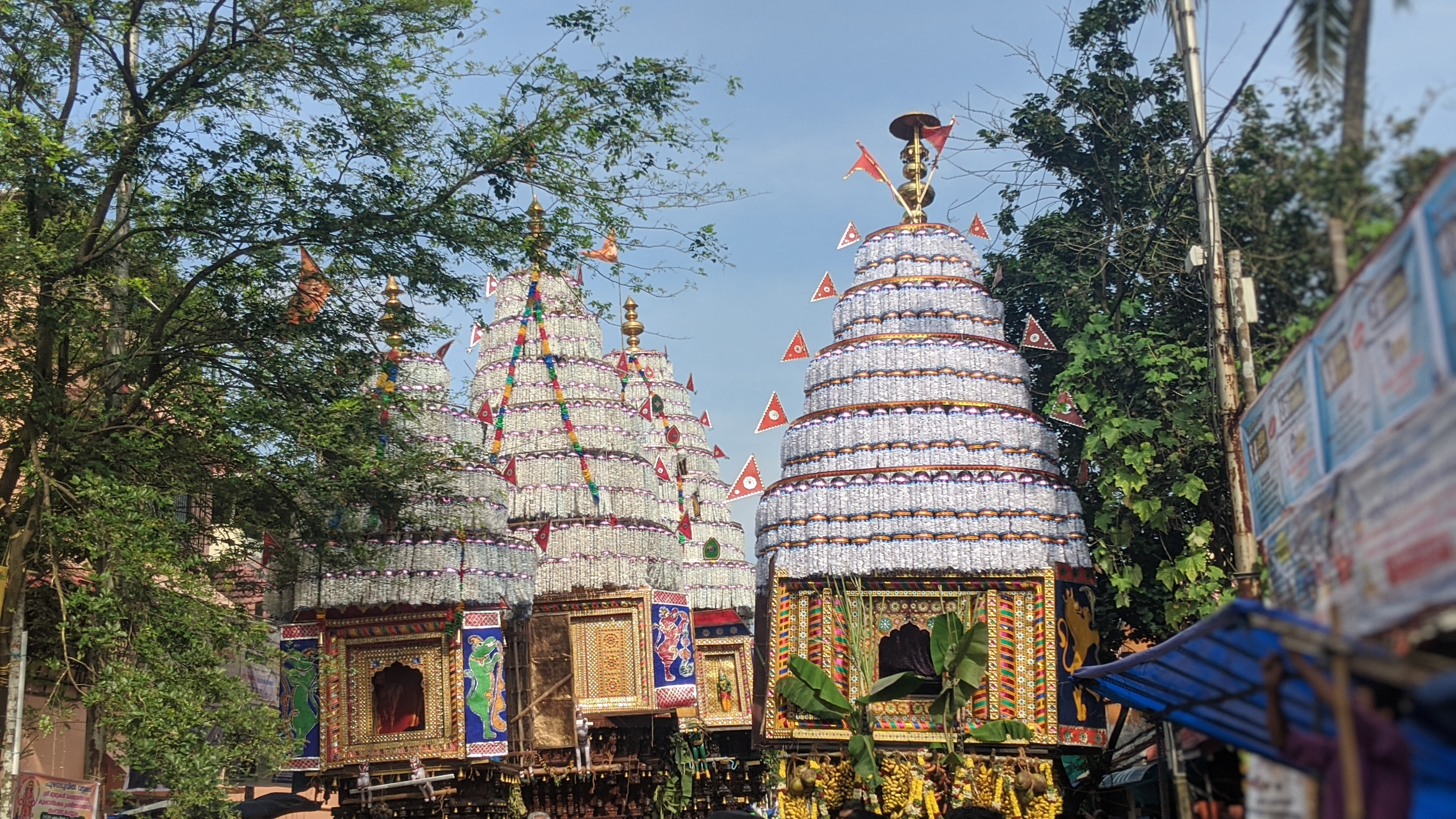
Kalpathy Ratholsavam chariots

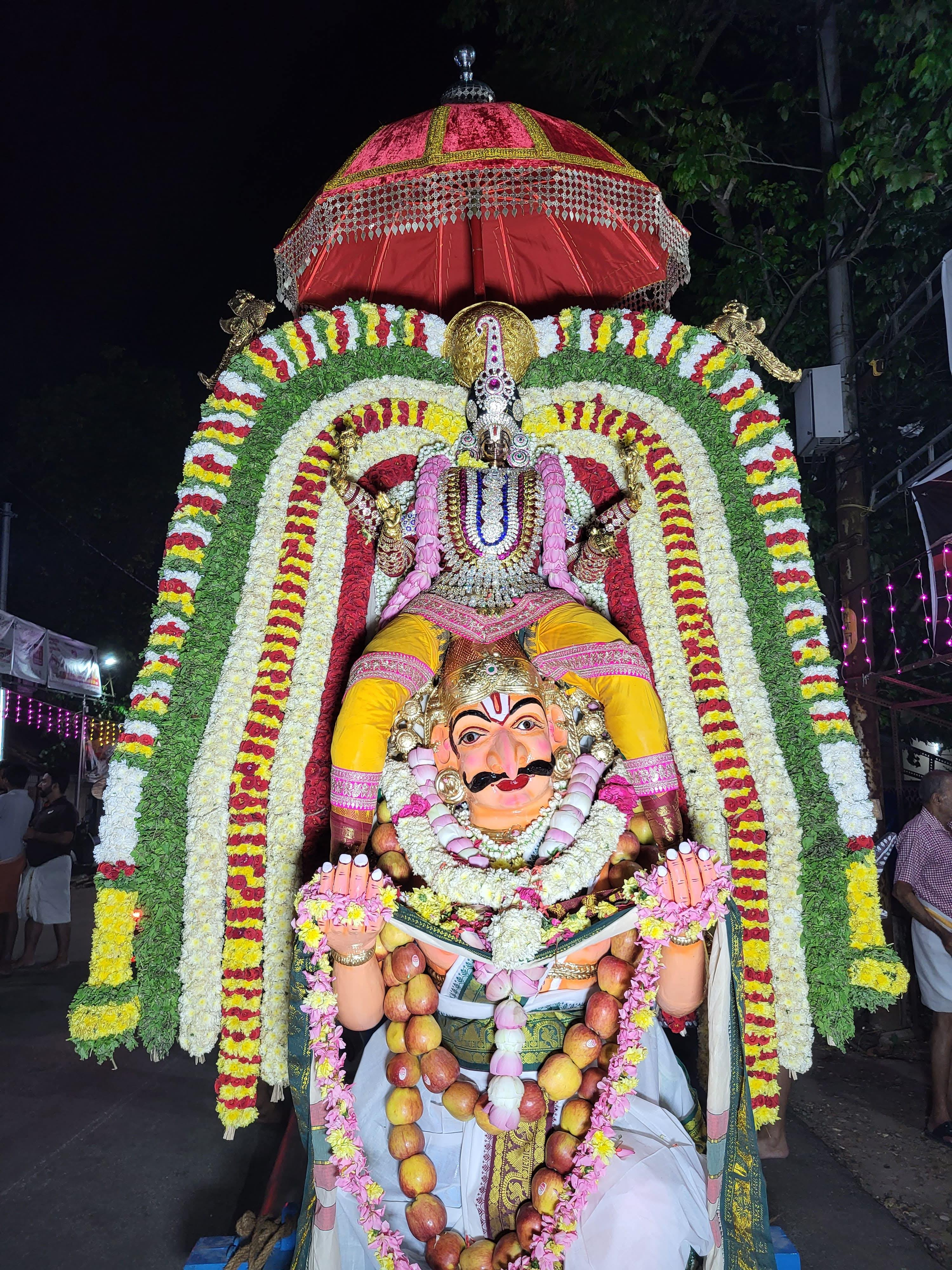
Garuda Vahana decoration of Lakshmi Narayana Perumal, Kalpathy Ratholsavam

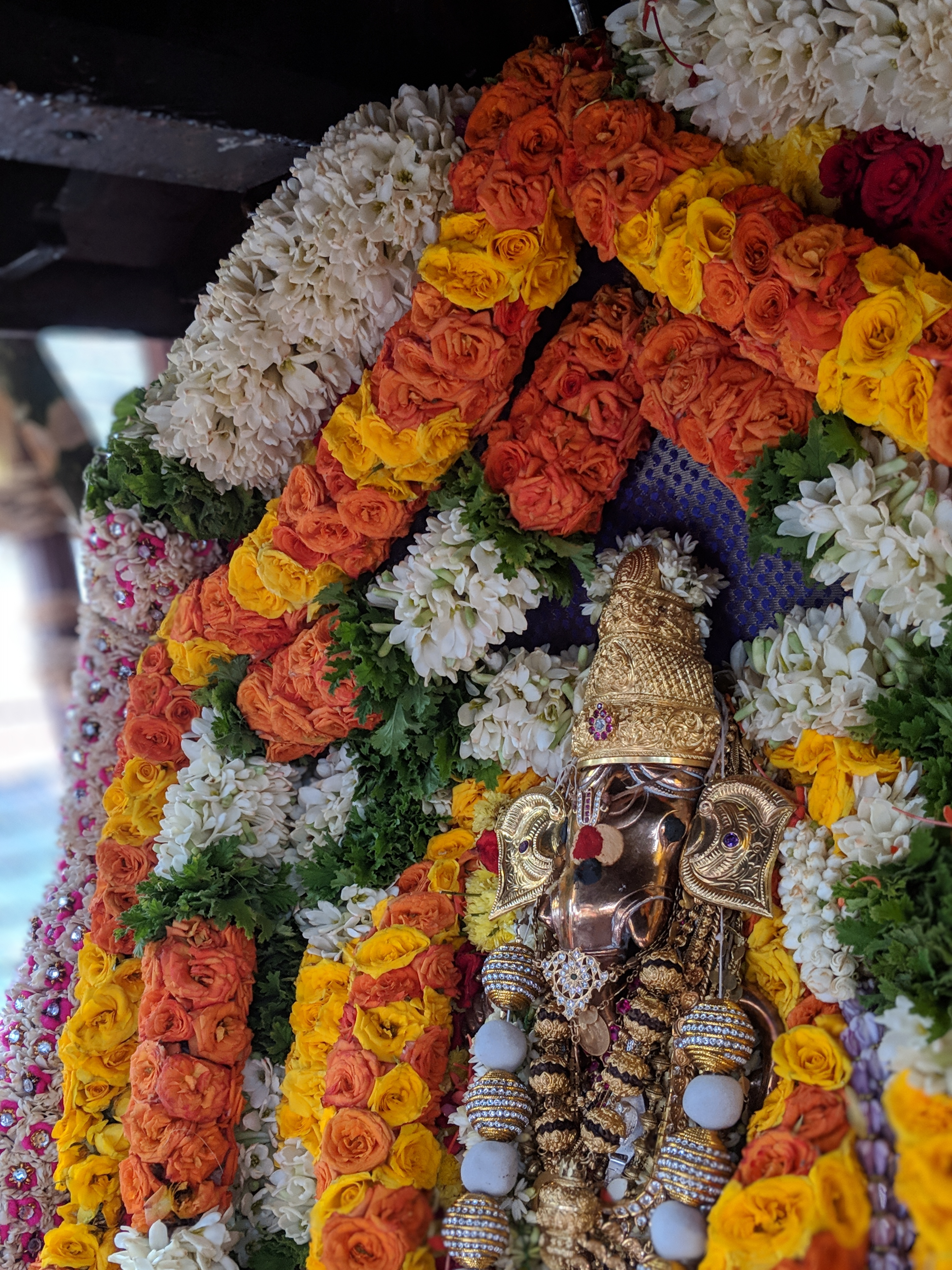
Lord Ganesha idol, Kalpathy Ratholsavam

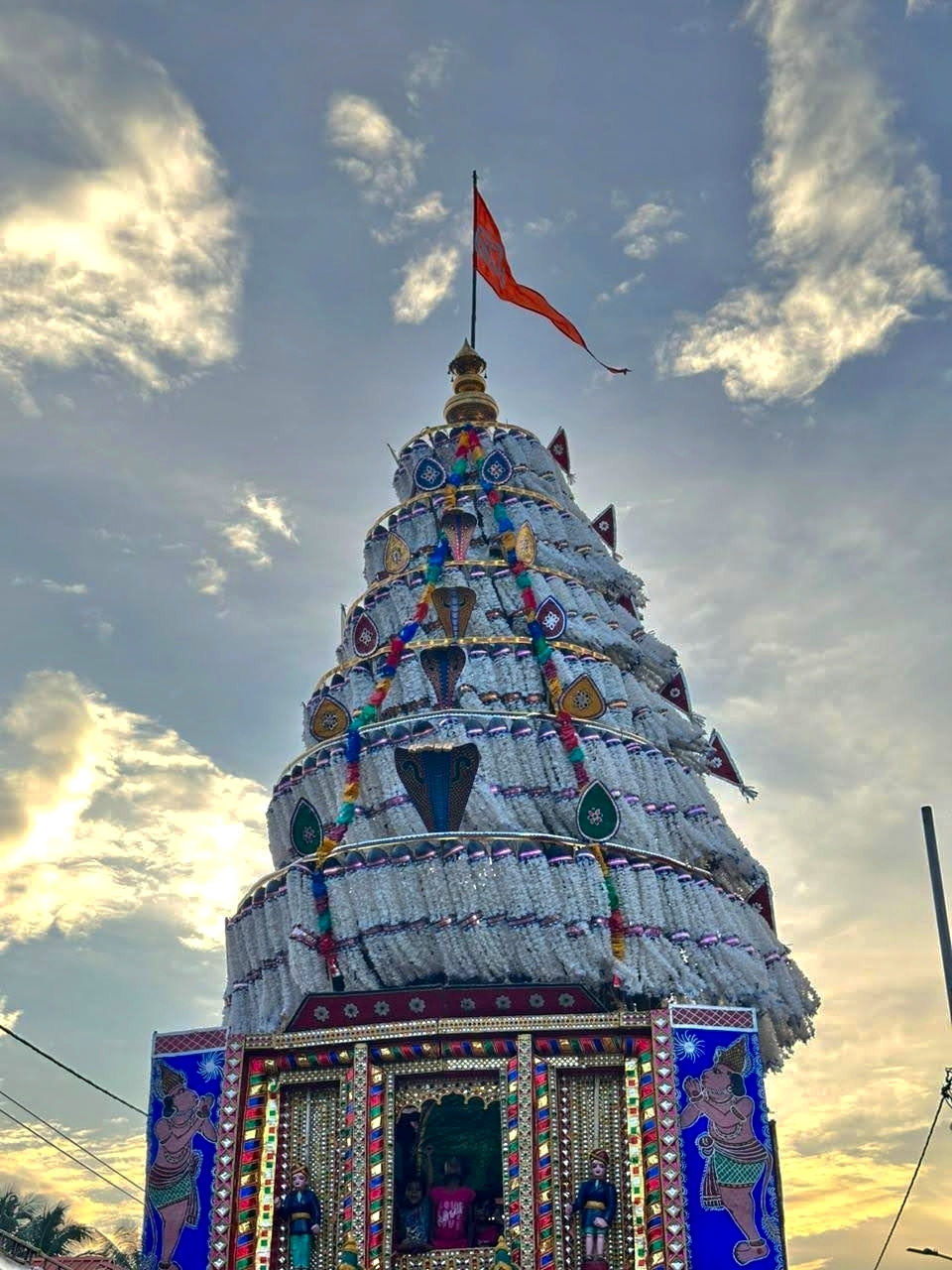
Chariot of the Kalpathy Ratholsavam

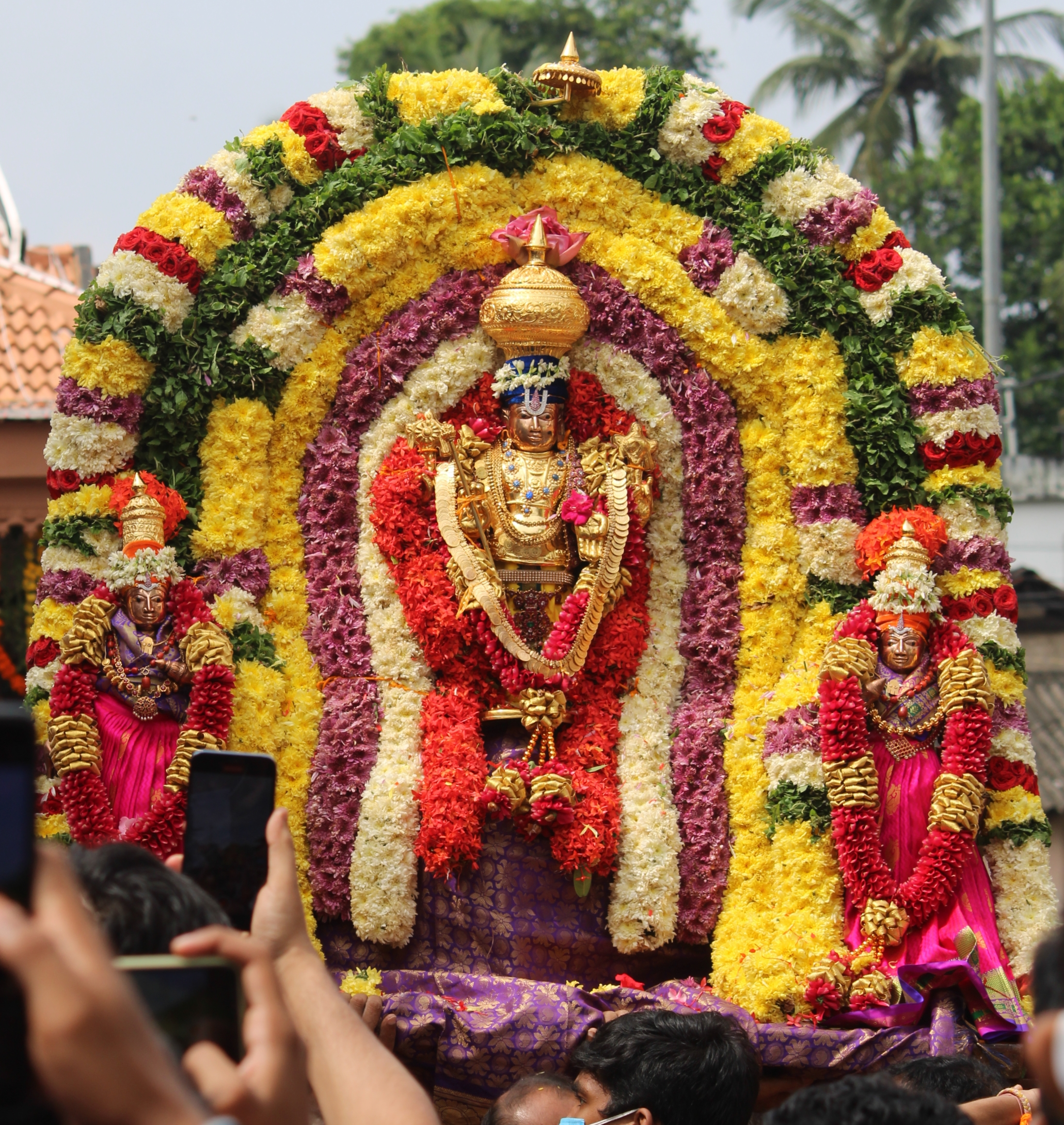
Lakshmi Narayana Perumal at Kalpathy Ratholsavam(മൂന്നാം തേര്)

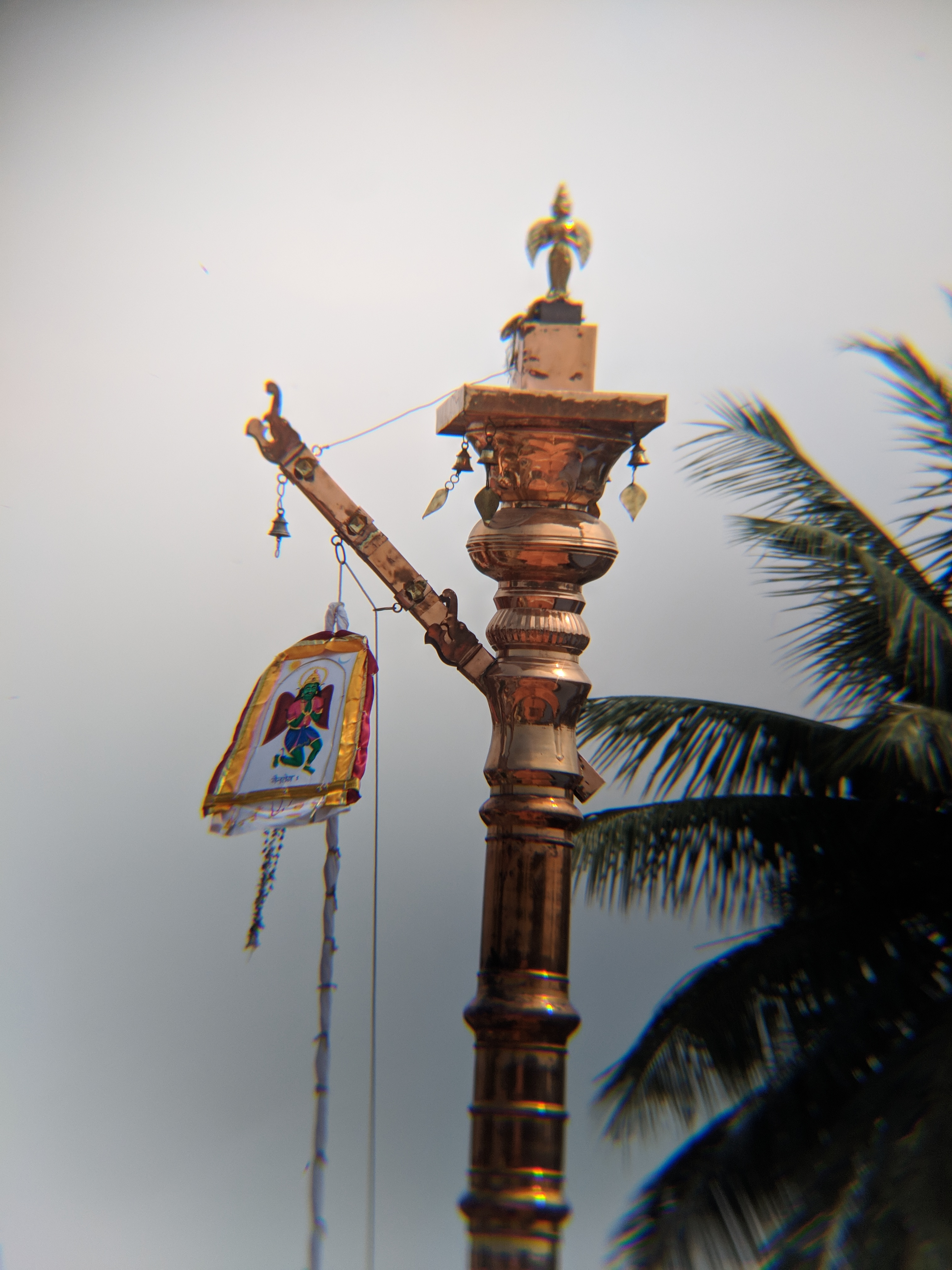
Flag of the Kalpathy Ratholsavam(കൊടിയേറ്റം)

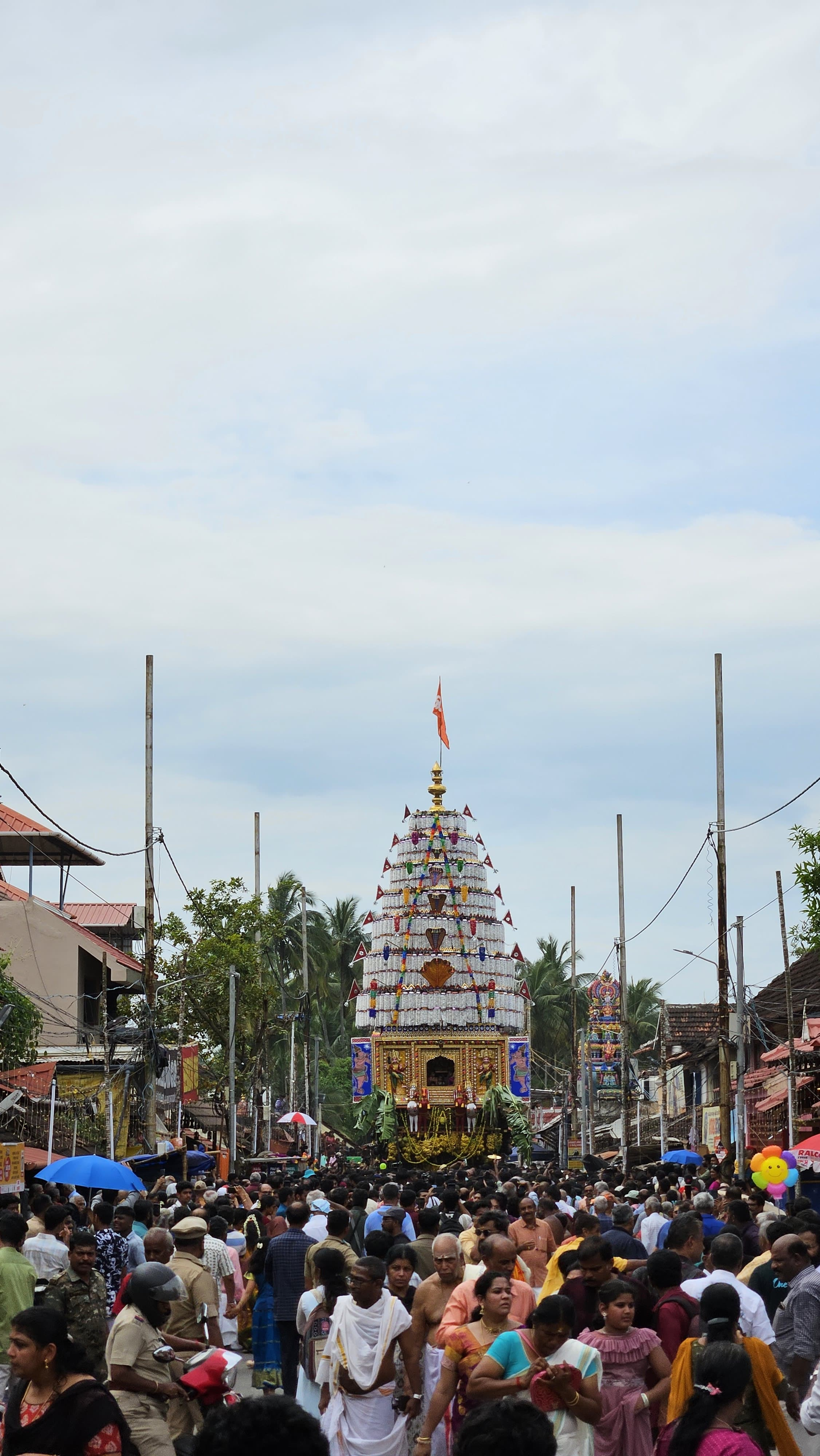
Chariot of the Kalpathy Radholsavam on Onnam(ഒന്നാം/First) Theru

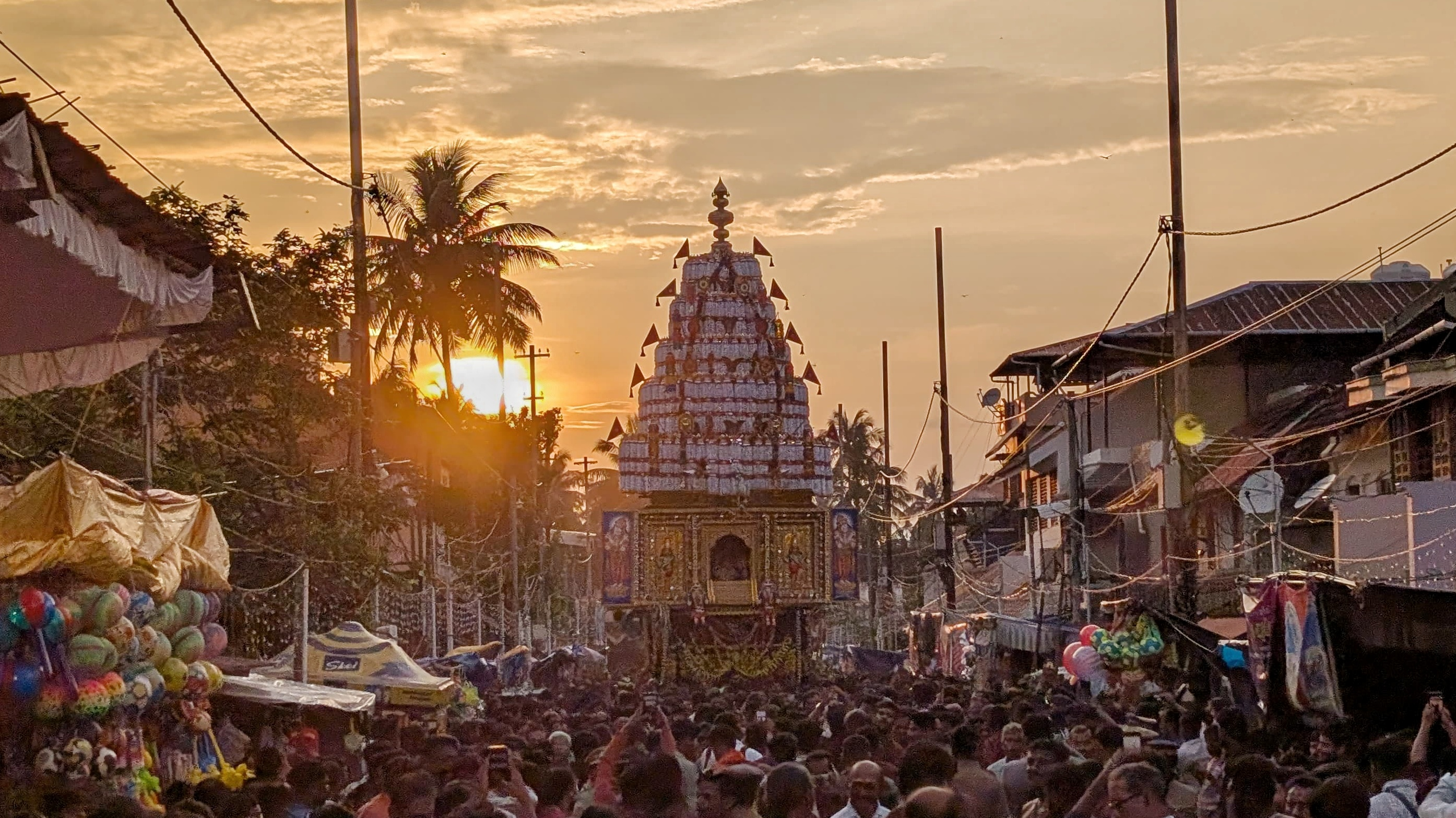
Chariot of the Kalpathy Radholsavam, at dusk

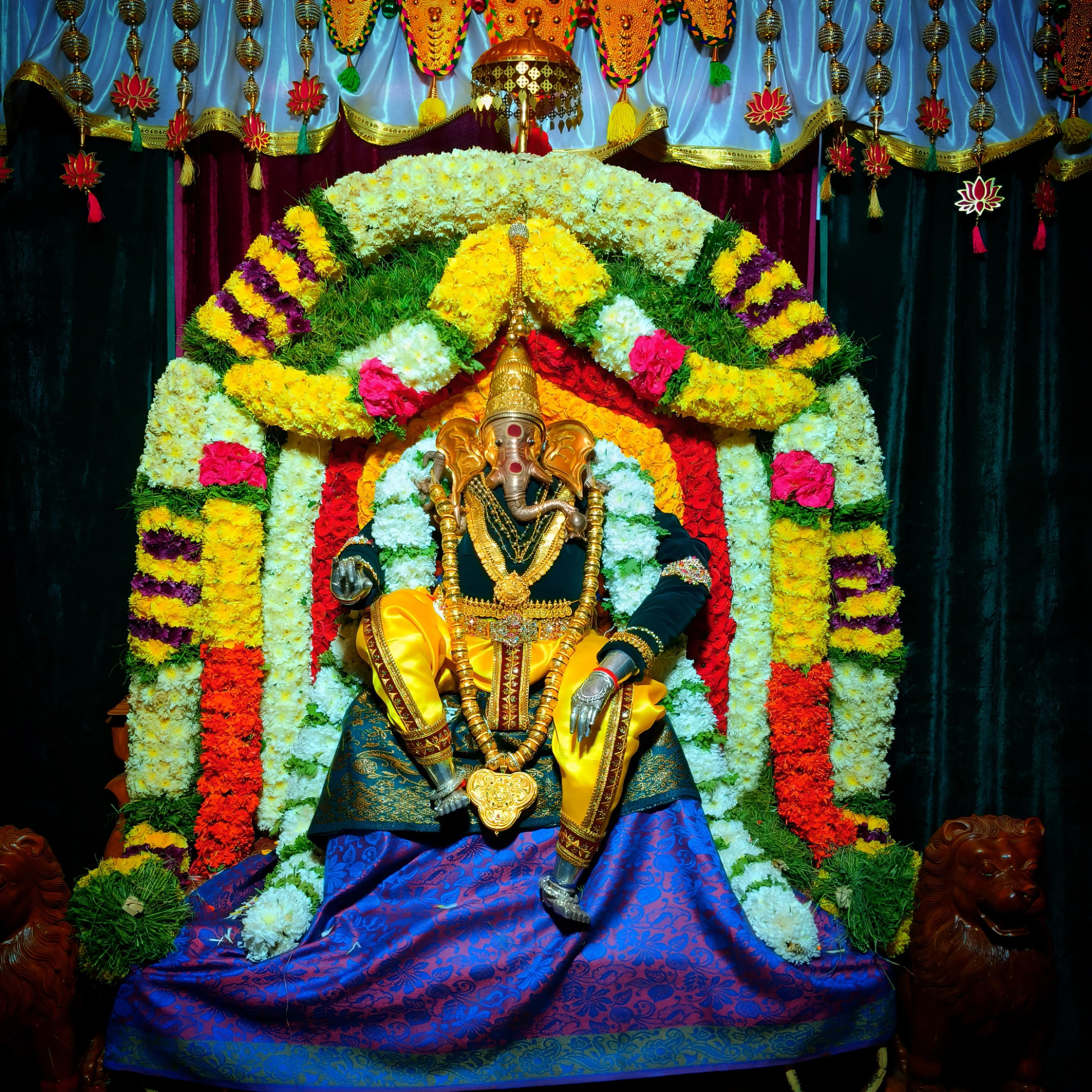
Manthakkara Mahaganapathy alangaram(decoration) during the Kalpathy Radholsavam

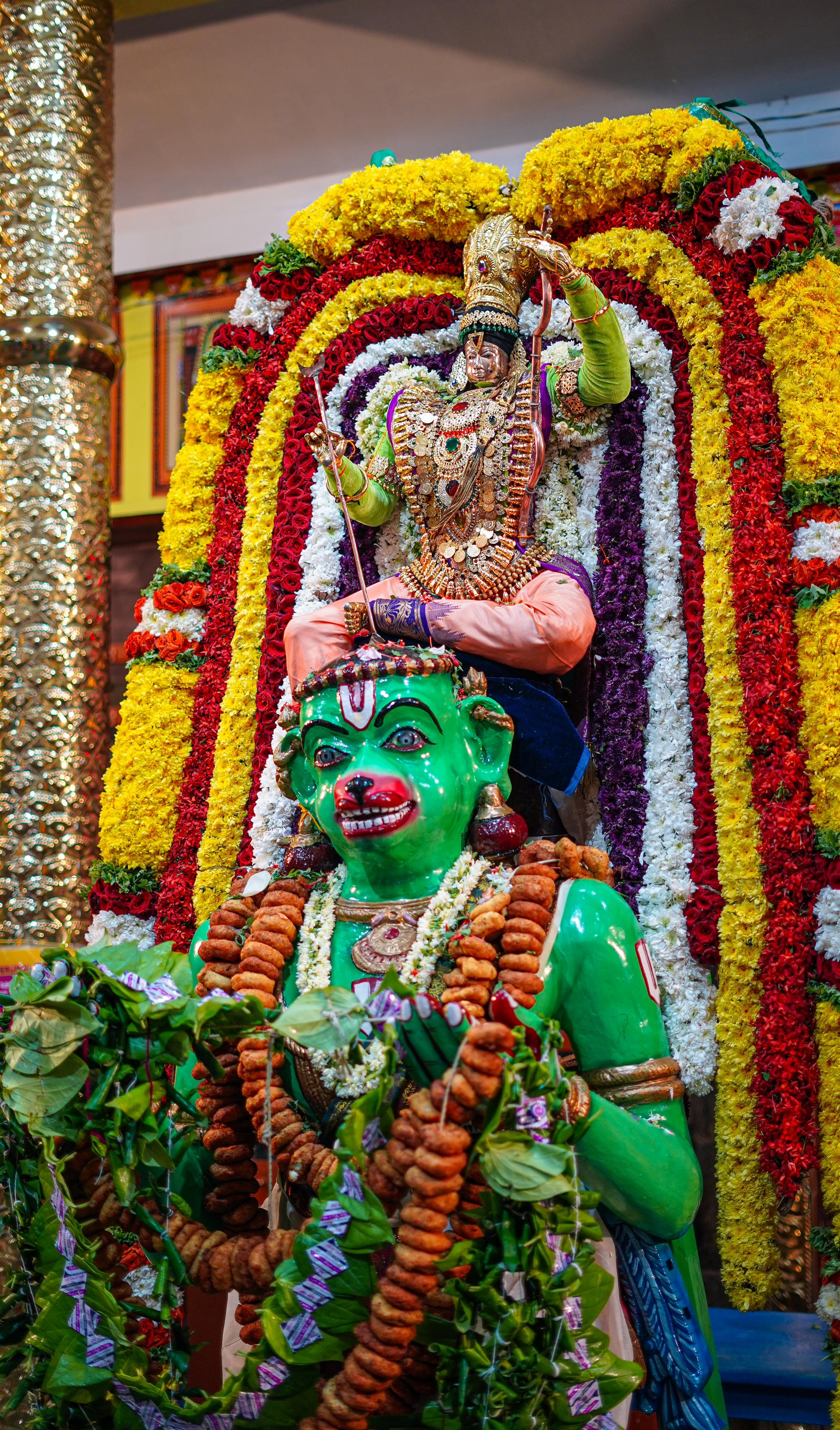
Hanuman Alankaram of Lakshmi Narayana Perumal
