= Kalpathy =

Kalpathy കൽപ്പാത്തി
- Suburb
- Kalpathy
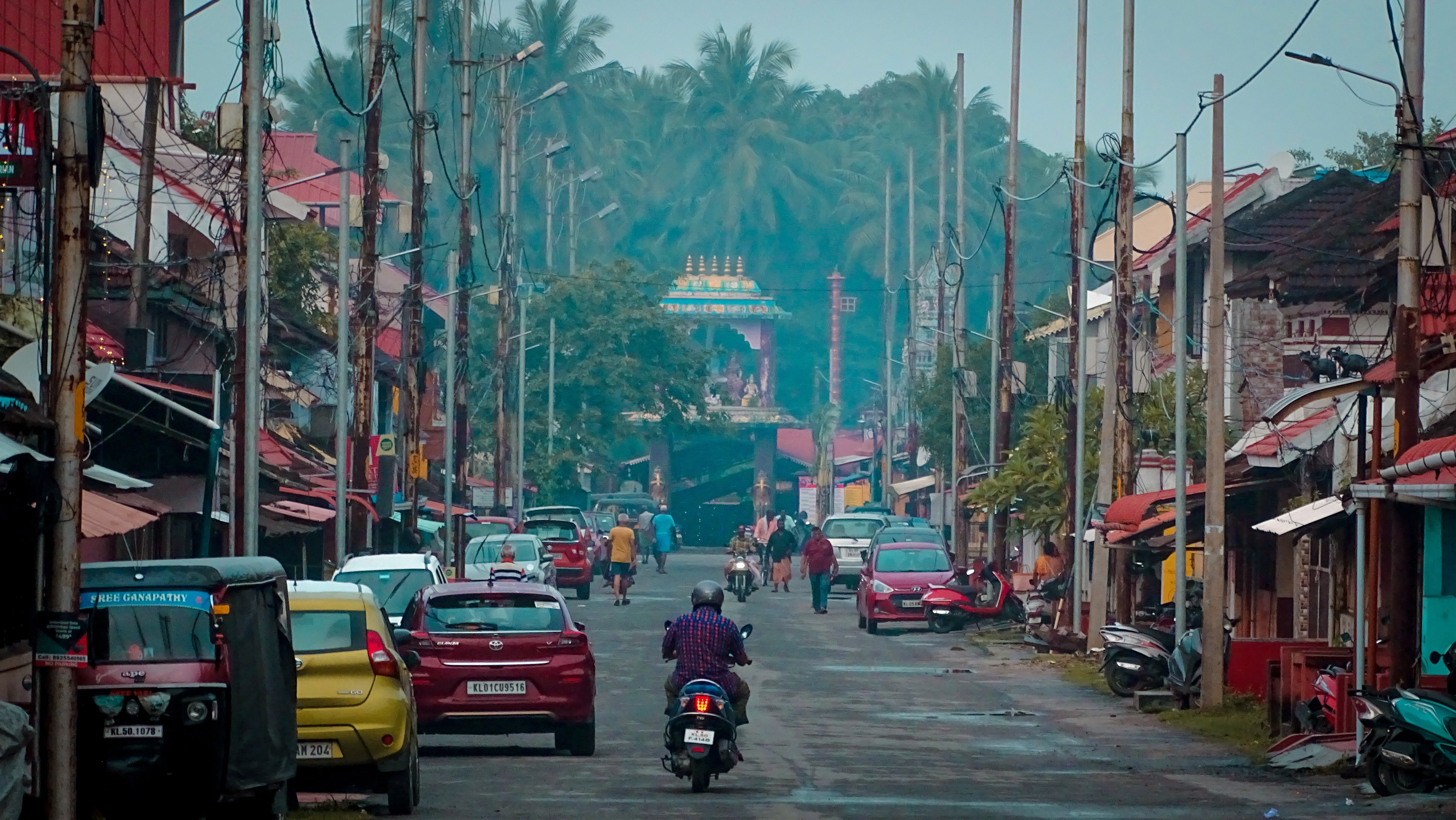
- A view of one of the streets in Kalpathy
- Nickname: Half Benaras
- Location in Kerala, India Kalpathy (India)
- Coordinates: 10°49′N 76°39′E
- Country: India
- State: Kerala
- District: Palakkad

Government
  - Body: Palakkad Municipality

Languages
  - Official: Malayalam, English
  - Regional: Malayalam, Tamil
- Time zone: UTC+5:30 (IST)
- PIN: 678 003
- Telephone code: 0491
- Vehicle registration: KL-09
- Parliament constituency: Palakkad
- Assembly constituency: Palakkad

Kalpathy or Kalpathi is a residential area in Palakkad city, Kerala, India. It is famous for the Viswanatha Swamy Temple, which is located along the banks of the Kalpathy river, one of the tributaries of the Bharathapuzha. It is also famous for the Kalpathy Radholsavam, which is an annual car festival taking place in the month of Thulam (November).

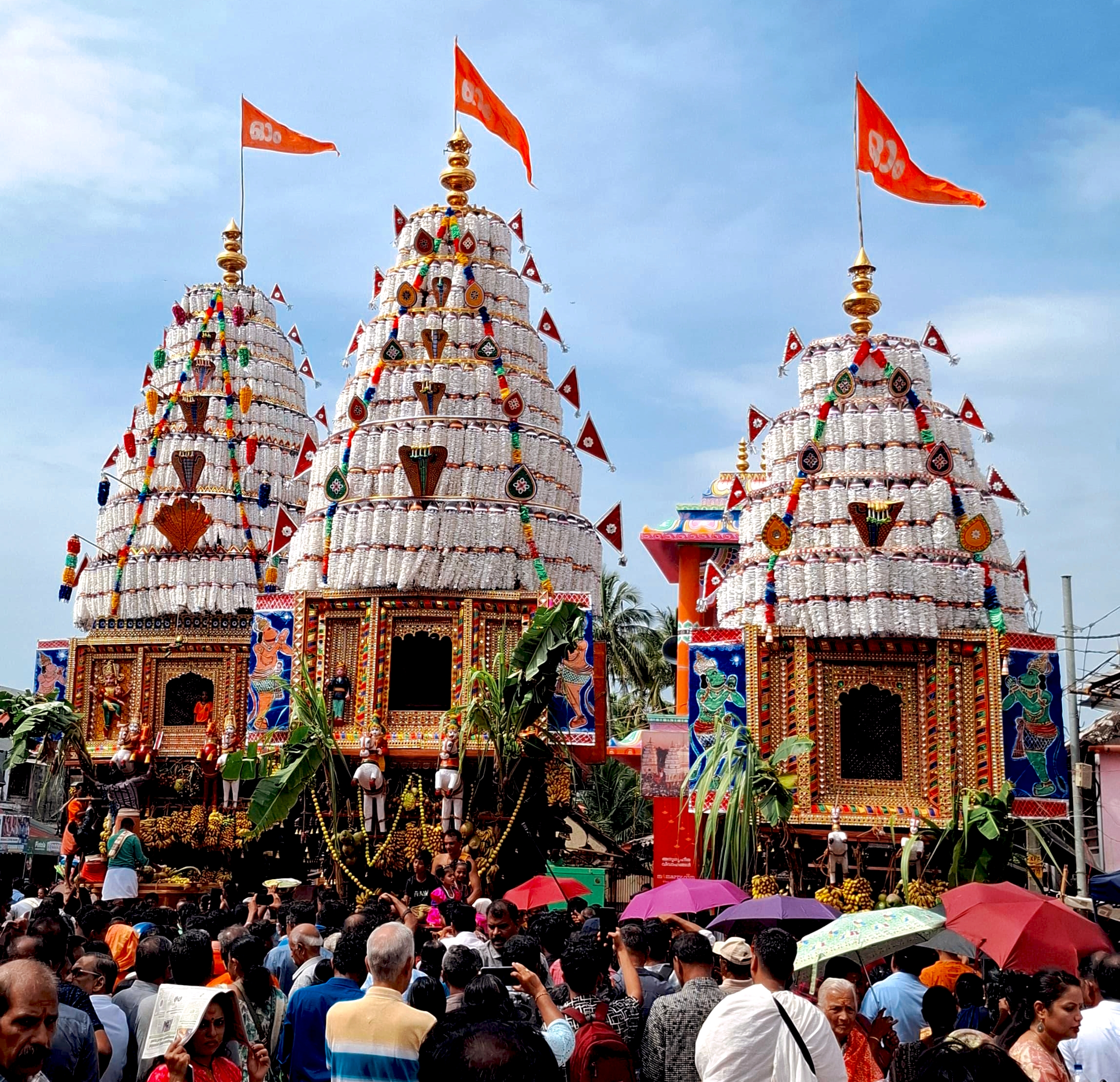
Three chariots of Lord Shiva, Ganesha & Kartikeya in the Kalpathy Ratholsavam

Kalpathy is an agraharam, or traditional village. It is the first heritage village in Kerala. This Tamil migrant brahmin village is more popular as the hub of Carnatic music in Kerala rather than for the legacy and tradition passed down through the generations for the past 600 years.

Kalpathy consists of five smaller villages, which are Old Kalpathy, New Kalpathy, Chathapuram, Govindarajapuram and Manthakkara. The similarity of the Viswanatha Swamy Temple to the Varanasi Kashi Viswanatha temple on the banks of Ganges is responsible for the moniker Kasiyil paathi Kalpathy (Half Kashi or Half Benaras) and the term Dakshina Kashi (Southern Kashi) associated with this temple.

The architecture here - each brahmin quarter sharing walls and adjoined with the next one forming a linear pattern, the streets that wake up to the Venkatesha Suprabhatham, Vedic mantra recitals and Shiva Sthothram (hymns) - the rice flour kolam in the front courtyard of each quarter, Idli, Sambar and ghee rich sweets and savouries from the Tamil food culture, and the Ratholsavam (Chariot Festival) are celebrated. The rolling of heavily decorated temple chariots through the village streets of Kalpathy is the main part of the festival.

Sree Viswanathaswamy temple is the main centre of the festival while the three satellite temples in the village of new Kalpathy, old Kalpathy and Chathapuram also take part in it. These were all passed on through the generations of lives in the Agraharam. Kalpathy and its neighbourhoods have witnessed large settlements of people in colonies and apartments, making it one of the major residential areas of the city.

Kalpathy also has its very own sports event, called the Kalpathy Sports Fest which is conducted annually, it started on October-November 2024.

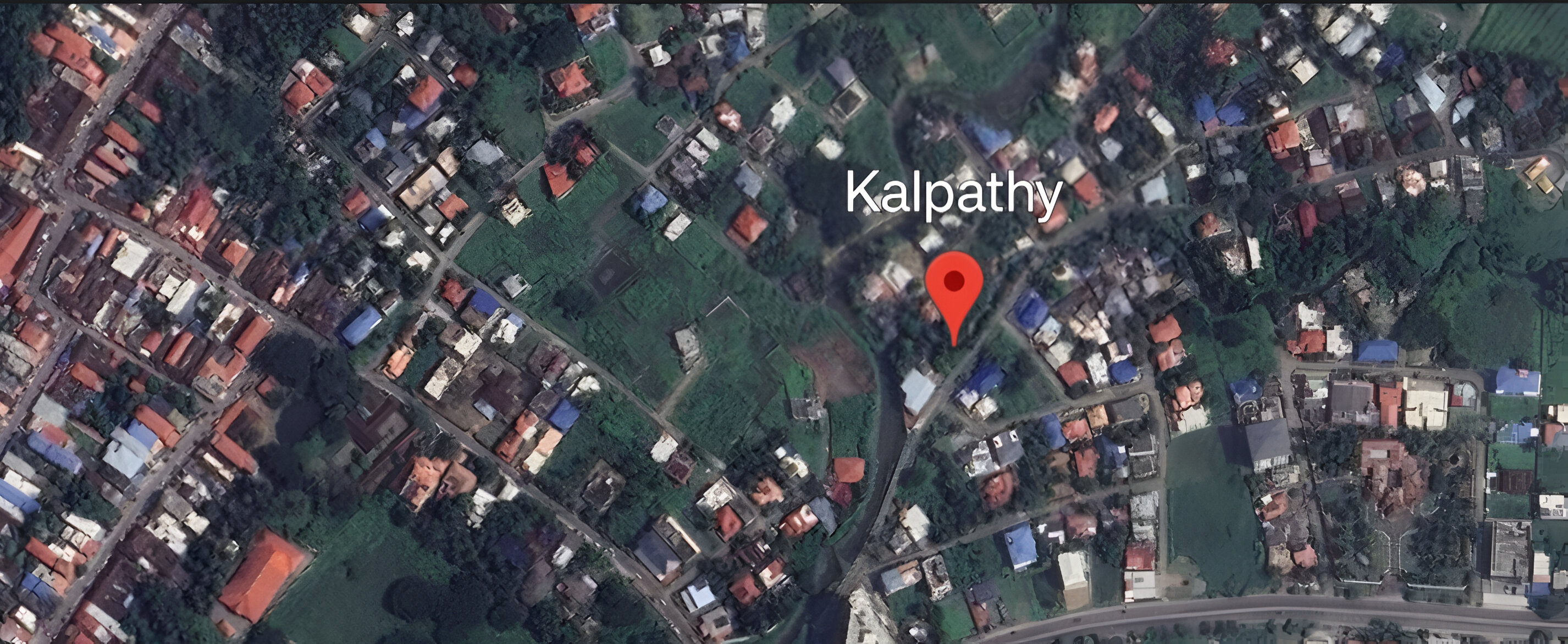
Aerial view of Kalpathy

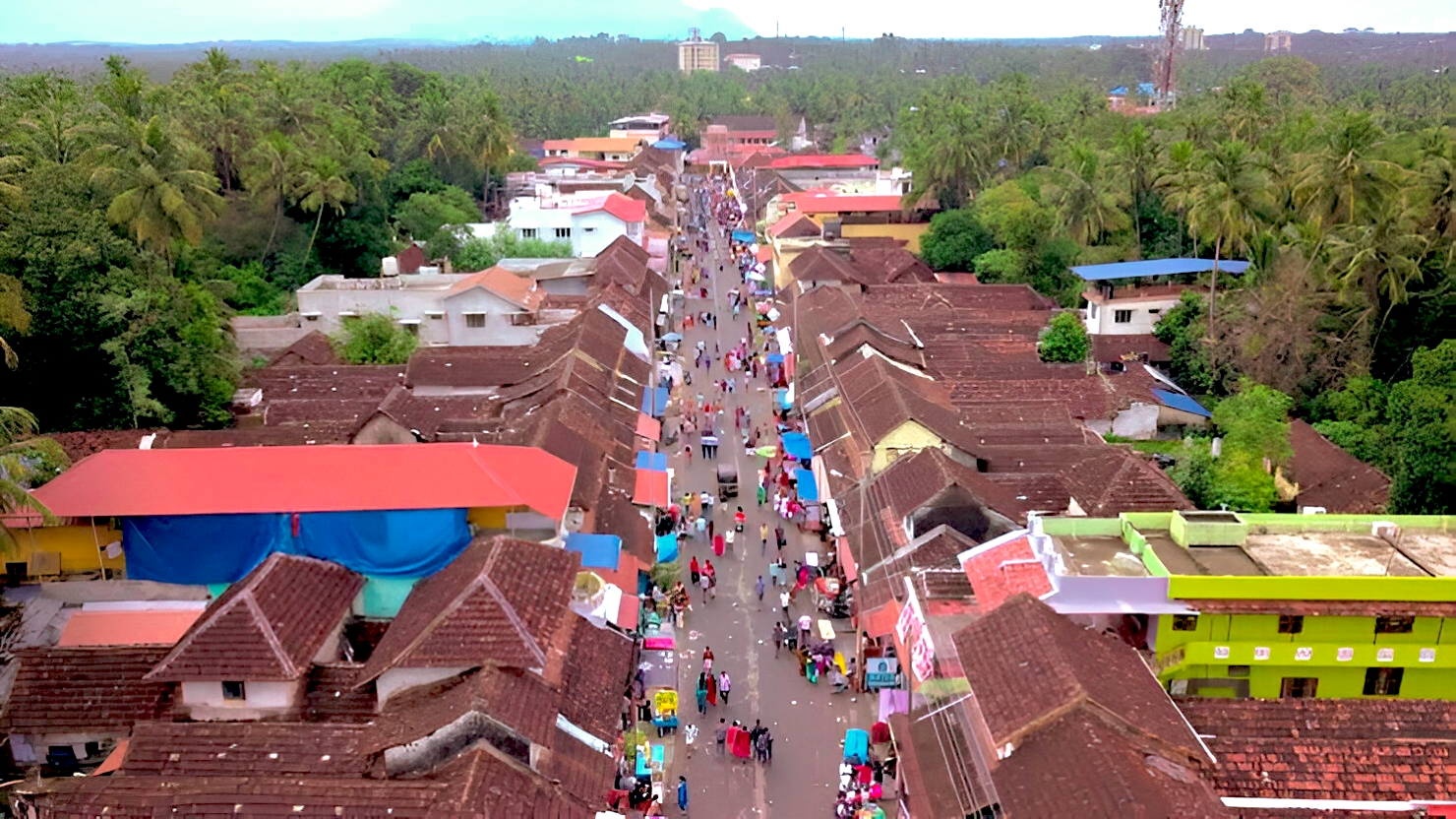
Aerial view of a street in Kalpathy

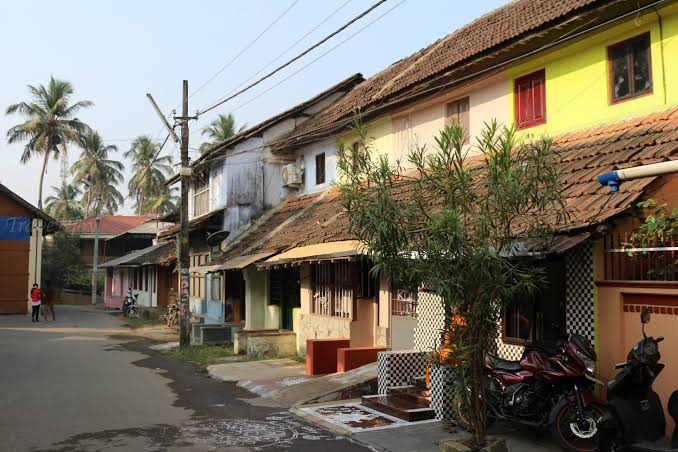
Chathapuram Street of Kalpathy

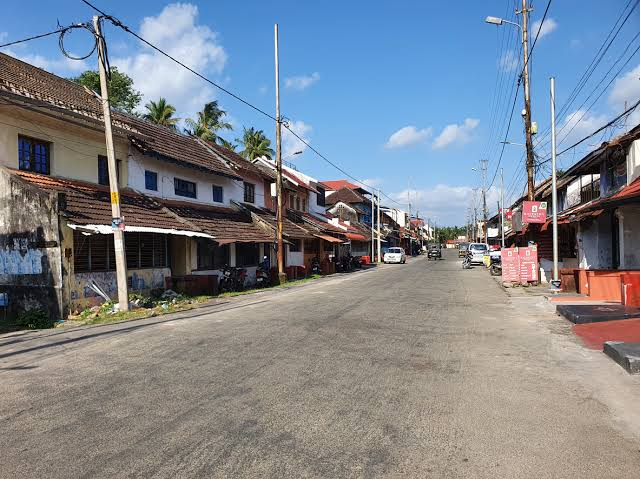
Manthakkara street of Kalpathy

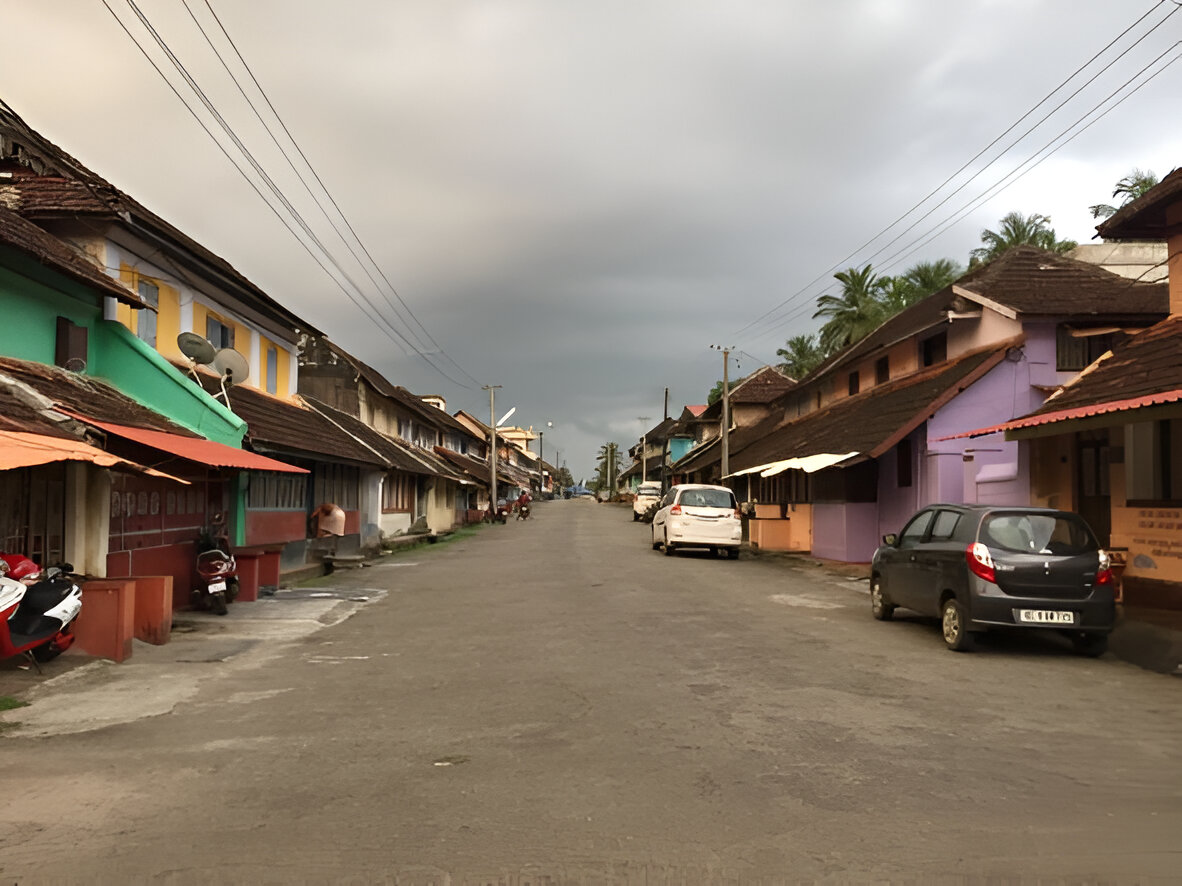
Govindarajapuram street in Kalpathy

== Temples ==
- Sree Visalakshi Sametha Sree Viswanatha Swamy Temple
- Sree Lakshmi Narayana Perumal Temple
- Sree Prasanna Mahaganapathy Temple
- Manthakkara Sree Maha Ganapathy
- Sri Varadaraja Perumal Temple
- Vaidhyanathapuram Krishna Temple

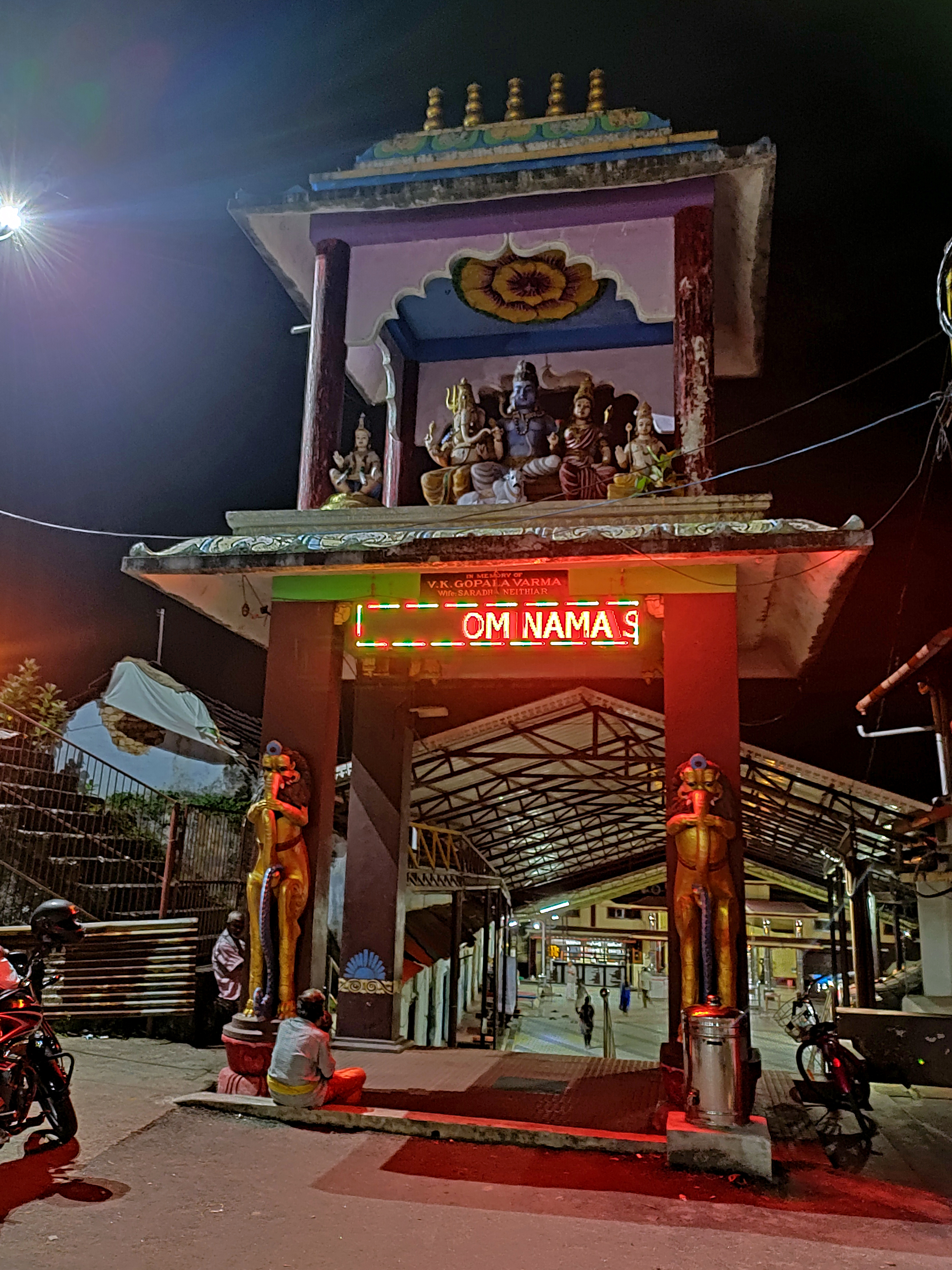
Viswanatha Swamy Temple Entrance

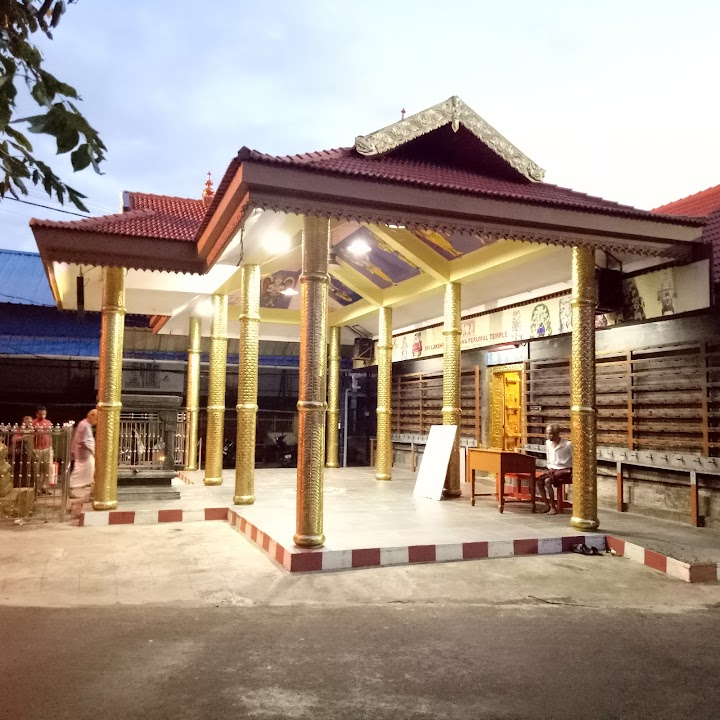
Lakshmi Narayana Perumal temple, Old Kalpathy

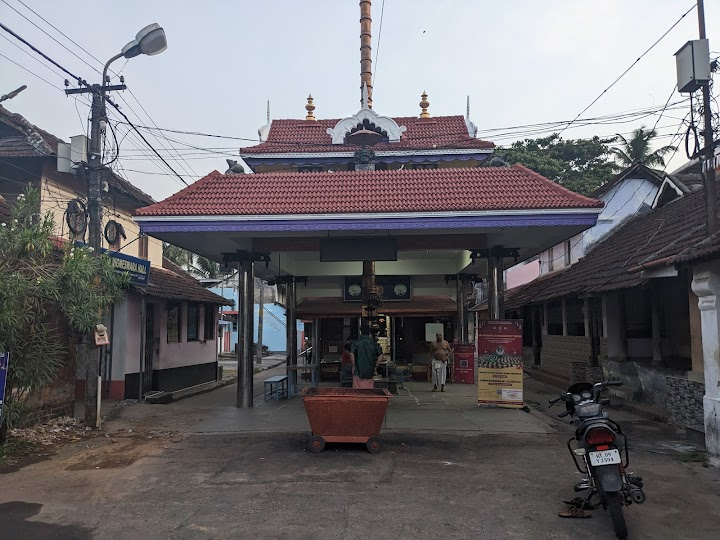
Chathapuram Prasanna Mahaganapathy temple

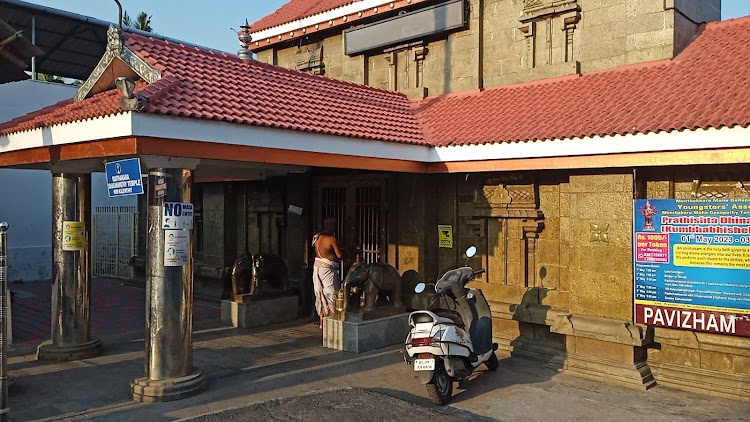
Manthakkara Mahaganapathy temple

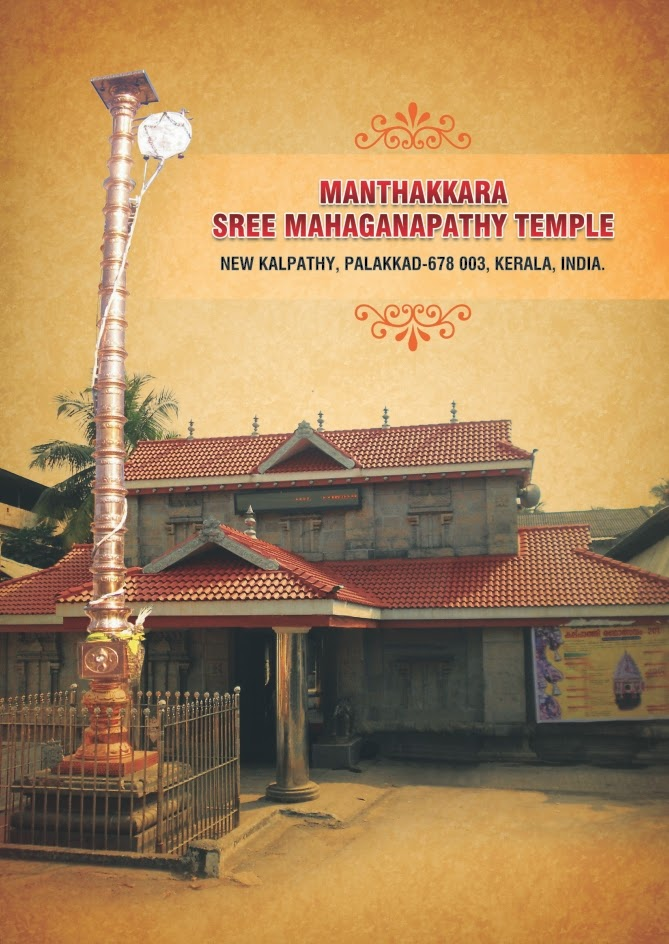
Poster of the Manthakkara Mahaganapathy temple

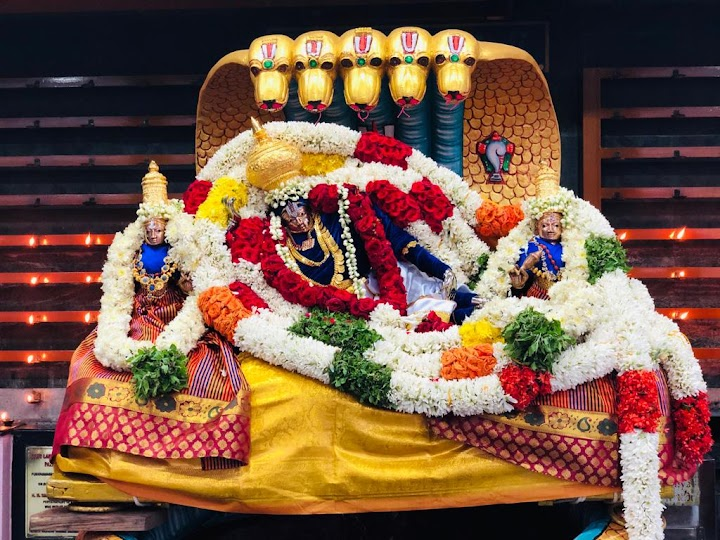
Lakshmi Narayana Perumal alangaram, Old Kalpathy

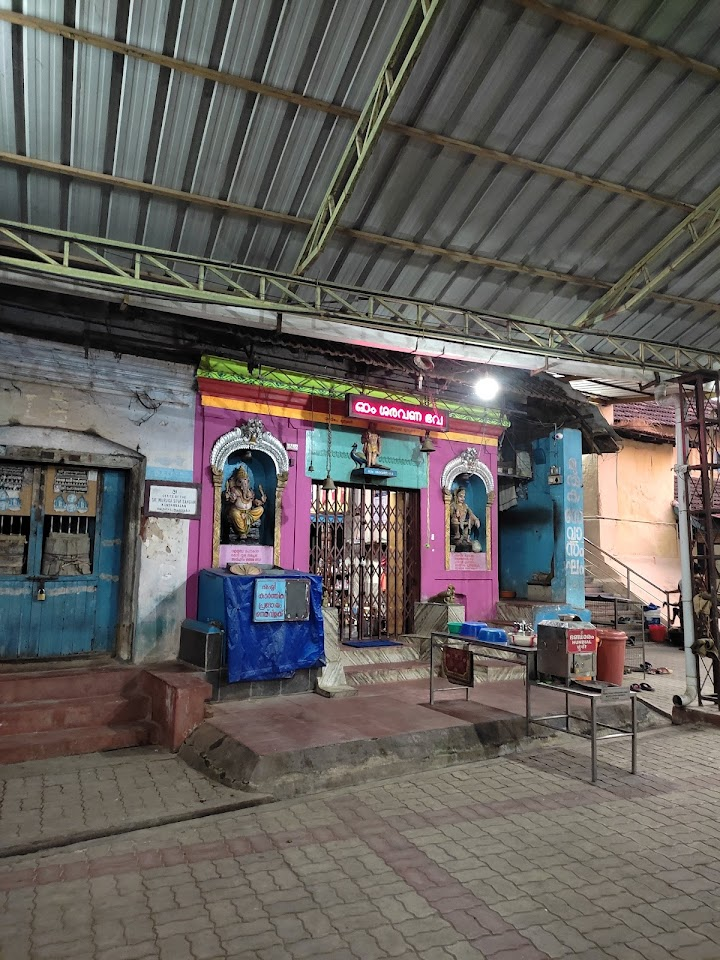
Muruga temple within the premises of Viswanatha Swamy temple

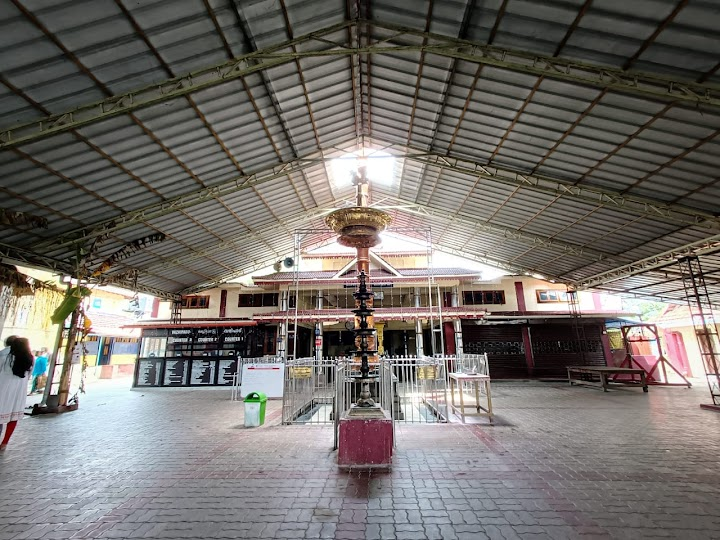
Viswanatha Swamy temple, New Kalpathy

== Location ==
Kalpathy is located about 3 km from the center of the city. City service buses are there to connect Kalpathy with other parts. The nearest major railway station is Palakkad Junction railway station and the nearest airport is Coimbatore International Airport.

== History ==
Kalpathy agraharam (the Tamil brahmin settled village next to the temple) was at the centre of a historical controversy in 1924. The famous Kalpathy Radholsavam passed through the main street of the agraharam which was a government funded and maintained road. In early 1920s, the road was not open to the so called lower castes ("awarnas"). The members of the Ezhava community were denied the use of the roads through this Brahmin village and the right to worship in the village temple. To counter this heinous practice, the members of the Ezhava community in Palakkad organized a rebellion by walking thru the public road and towards the temple. Despite the then British Presidency of Madras, under which Palakkad and Kalpathy fell, issuing an order permitting Ezhavas to enter Kalpathy, the conservative Brahmins of the village resisted the attempt. Many an Ezhava was roughed up by the Brahmins for attempting to enter the village.

A group of Ezhavas were "converted" into Arya Samaj. Subsequently, several groups of Ezhavas under various community leaders attempted to walk thru the public road. They were also forcibly denied entry by the residents of the Agraharam. A young man who was severely beaten up later converted to Christianity and took the name John Kittu and went on to become an independent MLA during the first elections to Kerala state assembly.

=== Recent history ===
In 2019, a sitting Kerala high court judge Justice V Chitambaresh hailing from Kalpathy agraraham, questioned the need for caste based reservation. He called Brahmins as twice-born endowed with good deeds of past births, having "characteristics like clean habits, vegetarian, a lover of Carnatic music and all good qualities rolled into one... is never communal, he is always considerate, he is an ahimsavadi (non-violent person)"
