= Gustav Adolf Steengracht von Moyland =

German diplomat and politician

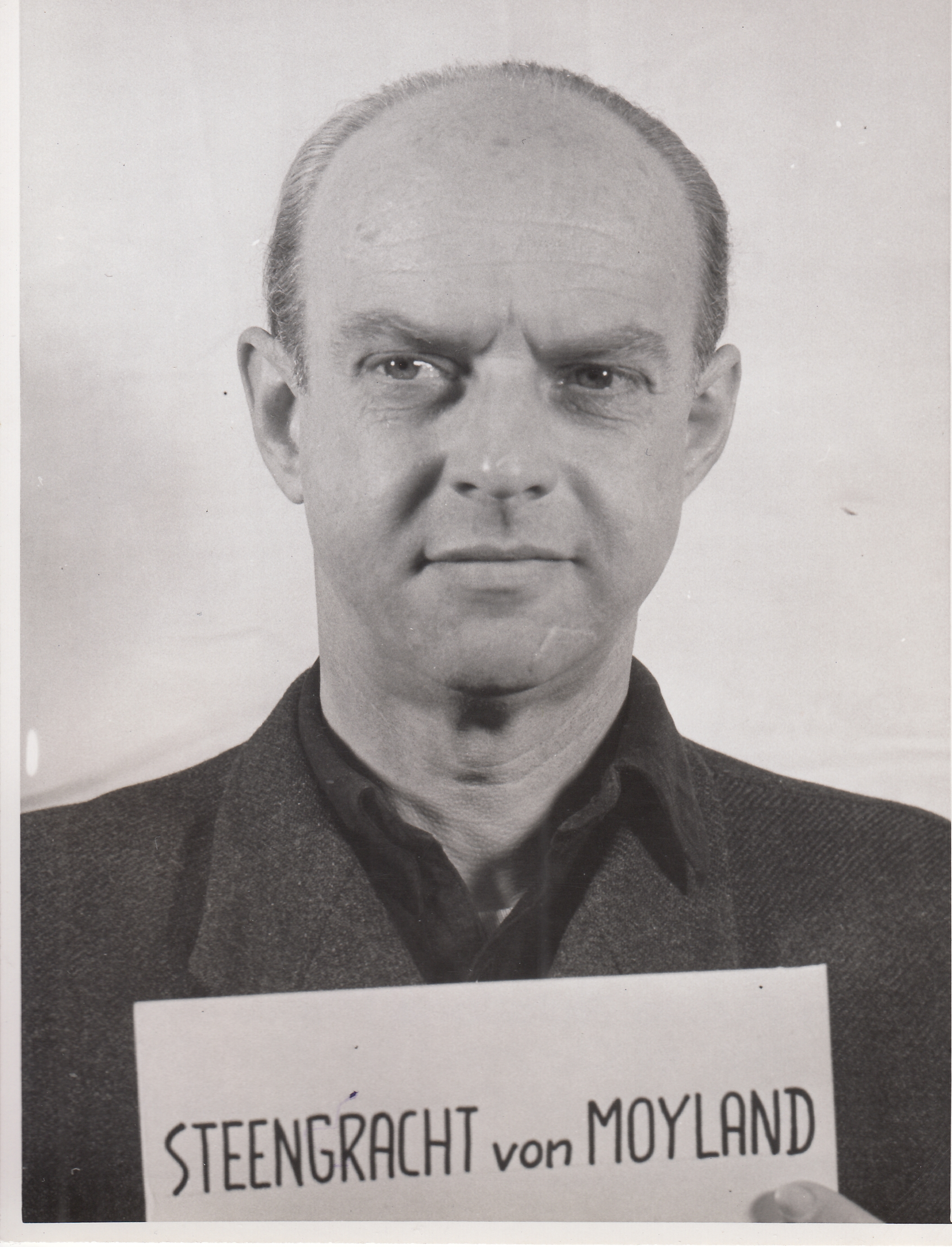
- Steengracht von Moyland in Allied custody c. 1947

Secretary of State at the Foreign Office Germany
- In office 1943–1945
- Preceded by: Ernst von Weizsäcker

Personal details
- Born: 15 November 1902 Moyland Castle, Bedburg-Hau, German Empire
- Died: 7 July 1969 (aged 66) Kranenburg, North Rhine-Westphalia, West Germany

Gustav Adolf Steengracht von Moyland (15 November 1902 – 7 July 1969) was a German diplomat and politician of Dutch descent, who served as Nazi Germany's Secretary of State at the Foreign Office from 1943 to 1945.

== Early life ==
Steengracht von Moyland was born near Kleve, the son of Nicolaas Adriaan Steengracht van Moyland, a Dutch nobleman who received the title of Baron in 1888. Shortly after his birth, Moyland was made a naturalized citizen of Prussia and the German Empire in 1902.

Steengracht studied law, agriculture, and economics at the University of Bonn and in 1923 joined the Corps Borussia Bonn. In 1929 he graduated as a doctor of laws. By 1928, he was a member of the Stahlhelm, and in 1933 he joined the Nazi Party (membership number 2,837,625) and the Sturmabteilung, being soon appointed as Kreisbauernführer of Kleve.

== Career ==
From 1936 to 1938, Steengracht worked in Joachim von Ribbentrop's office at the German Embassy in London. In October 1938, he was posted to the German Foreign Office in Berlin as Legation Secretary. From 1940 to 1943 he was on the personal staff of the Ribbentrop, from 1941 as his Deputy Chief Adjutant. On 31 March 1943 he succeeded State Secretary Ernst von Weizsäcker, remaining in office until the end of the war. Steengracht was by then a Brigadeführer of the SA, a one-star rank equivalent to brigadier-general.

== War crimes ==
After the war, Steengracht von Moyland was arrested as a potential war criminal. In 1949 he was tried by the Americans at the Ministries Trial, one of the subsequent Nuremberg trials, convicted, and sentenced to seven years in prison. However, in 1949 his sentence was reduced to five years after one of his convictions was overturned. He was released from prison in 1950 and spent the rest of his life at his family castle, Schloss Moyland.
