= Ernst Friedrich Zwirner =

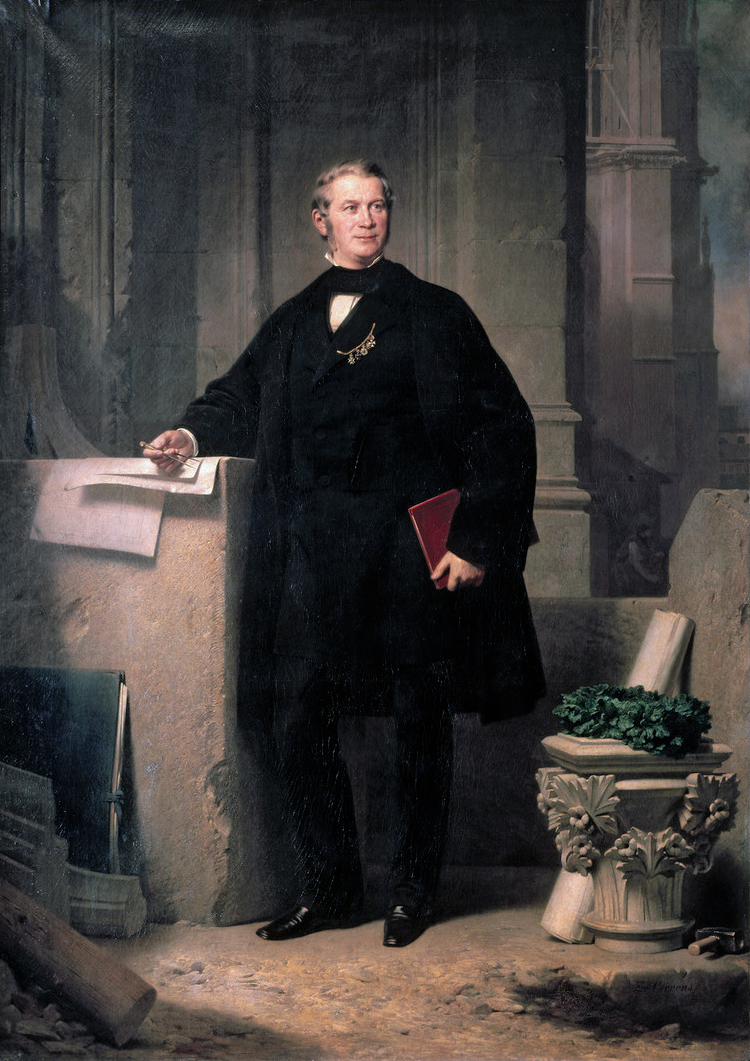
Ernst Friedrich Zwirner, portrait by Erich Correns

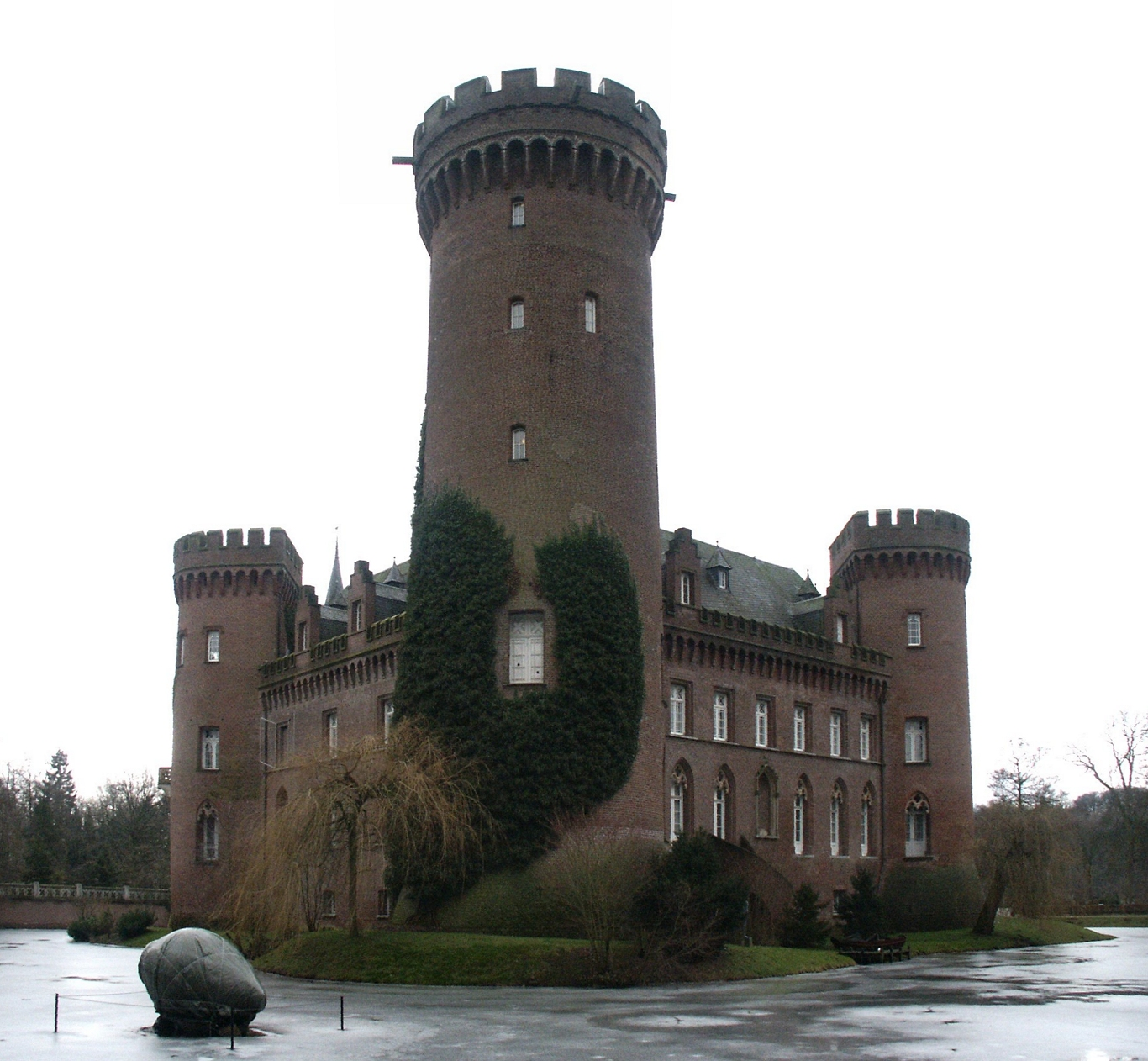
Keep of Castle Moyland

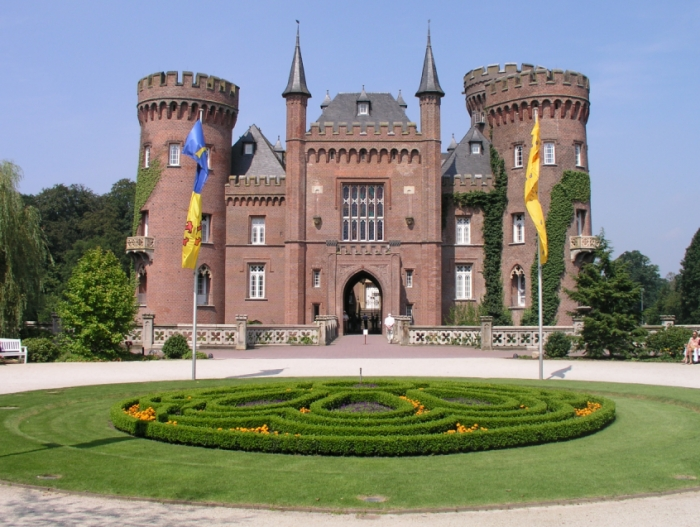
Castle Moyland

Ernst Friedrich Zwirner (1802–1861) was an architect. He studied in Breslau and Berlin, and worked at the latter place under Karl Friedrich Schinkel.

He was born at Jakobswalde [Kotlarnia] in Silesia in 1802. From 1833 he was the leading architect of Cologne Cathedral, which was to finally be completed. At Cologne, he was next to Vincenz Statz the most important practical representative of Gothic Revival architecture. Zwirner was assigned the restoration after the death of Friedrich Adolf Ahlert, . After the work of restoration was finished, he presented his plans for the completion of the structure in 1841 to King Frederick William IV; upon the approval of the plans the work began the next year.

Zwirner's best building is probably the church of St. Apollinaris at Remagen, to which, however, the same objection of monotony of plan has been made. He also built a church at Mülheim on the Rhine, and one at Elberfeld. He restored the castle of Argenfels on the Rhine, built the castle of Herdringen in the style of the ancient fortress castles on the Rhine for Count von Fürstenberg, and also the Moyland Castle near Cleves. He designed a mausoleum for the family of Count Ernst Zur Lippe-Biesterfeld on the grounds of the Klosterruine Heisterbach near Königswinter, and built the Rathaus (Town Hall) in Kolberg, Pomerania. His last work was the magnificent, 1861 Moorish Revival Glockengasse Synagogue at Cologne. He died at Cologne in 1861. He is buried in the Melaten-Friedhof.

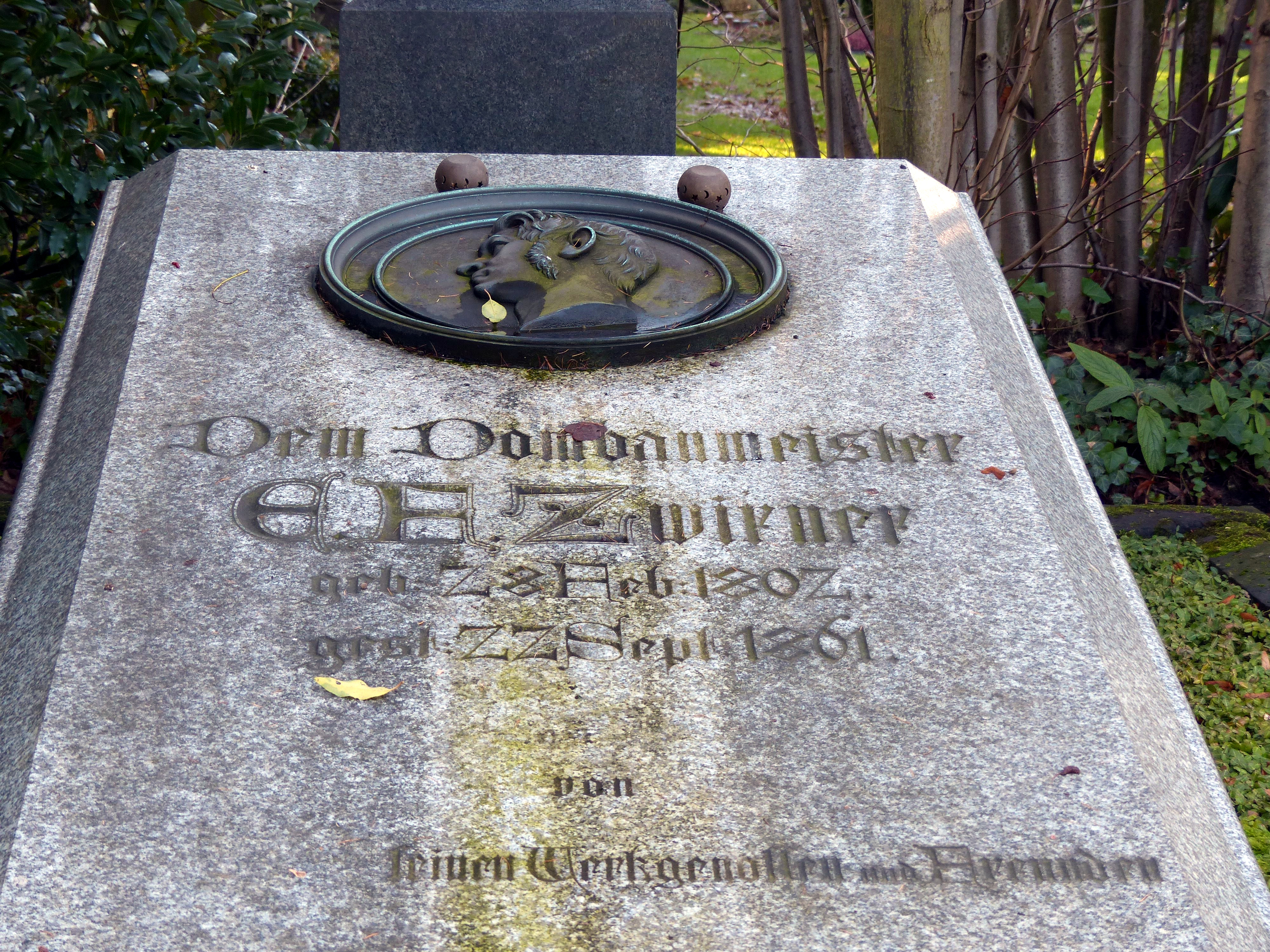
Ernst Friedrich Zwirner's Tombstone at Melaten cemetery in Cologne
