= Herdringen Castle =

- Schloss Herdringen
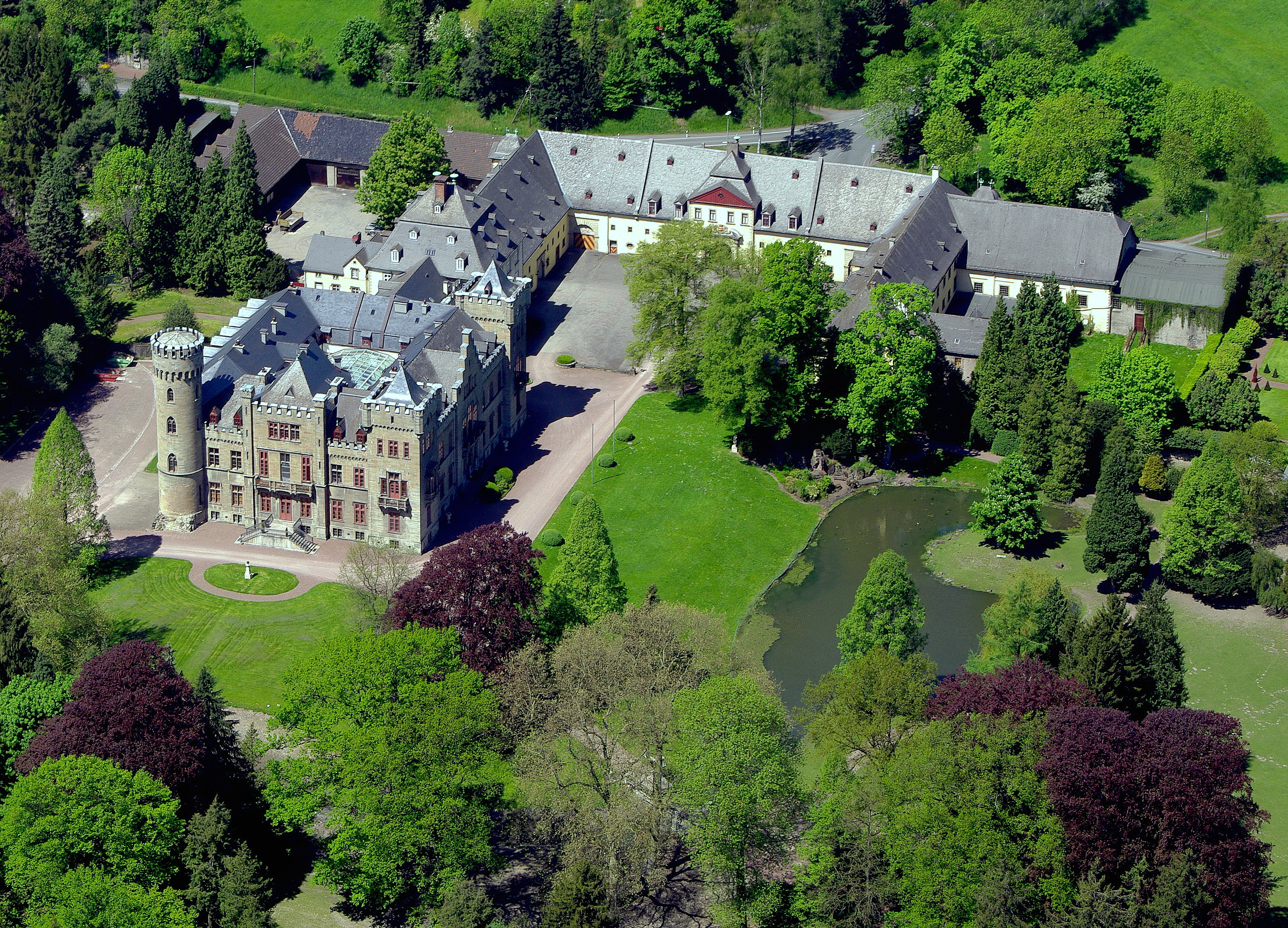
- Schloss Herdringen in 2008

- Location within Germany
- Alternative names: Jagdschloss Herdringen

General information
- Type: manor house
- Architectural style: Gothic revival or Tudor revival
- Location: Arnsberg, Germany
- Coordinates: 51.42°N 7.97°E
- Construction started: 1844
- Completed: 1853

Design and construction
- Architect: Ernst Friedrich Zwirner

Herdringen Castle (German: Schloss Herdringen) is a castle in the Ortsteil Herdringen of the town of Arnsberg, Germany. It is the seat of the Fürstenberg-Herdringen family and the present building (built from 1844 to 1853 to designs by Ernst Friedrich Zwirner) is one of the most notable secular Gothic revival buildings in Westphalia.

== History ==
The Herdringen manor was first mentioned in a document in 1376. It belonged to the von Ketteler family until 1543, and then to the von Westrem family. In 1618, the Paderborn prince-bishop Dietrich von Fürstenberg bought it and inherited it from his nephew. Since then, the property has belonged to the Barons of Fürstenberg. The three-winged outer bailey was built between 1683 and 1723.

The actual castle was built between 1844 and 1853 according to plans by Ernst Friedrich Zwirner. Zwirner also completed the Cologne Cathedral as master builder. The chapel of the castle is therefore a reminder of this important building.

One of the highlights of the almost 700-year history was the visit of the Prussian King Friedrich Wilhelm IV, who was a guest in the castle in 1853. One of the halls still bears the name "Königssaal".

After the occupation period, the castle was rented to the Paderborn Diocesan Caritas Association from 1947 to 1968 and then to a private school authority until 1998. Since the turn of the millennium, the current lord of the castle, Wennemar Freiherr von Fürstenberg, has devoted himself to the renovation of the complex.

As an upscale venue, the castle has hosted many weddings, concerts, conferences and other events for 20 years now, which have been able to enjoy an extraordinary ambience within the beautiful historic premises.

Due to the COVID-19 pandemic, the jewel of Herdringen closed the gates to the public. However, the lord of the castle took this situation as an opportunity to have further restoration work carried out in order to continue operations in the future. The central administration of Baron von Fürstenberg will in future be transferred to the "Schloss Herdringen Cultural Foundation" and the property will be converted into a museum as part of this. Mail: info@schloss-herdringen.de

== In popular culture ==
The 1961 film Der Fälscher von London (Forger of London) by Austrian director Harald Reinl was filmed at Wandsbek Studios in Hamburg, with location shooting at Herdringen Castle. In 1963, Herdringen Castle and its English landscape park generously laid out in the 1840s were used as "Chelford Manor" during the filming of Der Schwarze Abt (Black Abbot), a German crime film by Austrian screenwriter and film director Franz Josef Gottlieb. Both films are based on writings by Edgar Wallace and presently available as free download on RareLust website.

== Bibliography ==
- (in German) Michael Jolk: Der Bau der barocken Vorburg des Schlosses Herdringen unter Mithilfe der Rüthener Steinhauer Walck und Rabaliatti. In: SüdWestfalen Archiv. Landesgeschichte im ehemals kurkölnischen Herzogtum Westfalen und der Grafschaft Arnsberg. Heft 2, Arnsberg 2002, p. 141–151.
- (in German) Die Baudenkmäler der Stadt Arnsberg. Erfassungszeitraum 1980–1990. Arnsberg, 1990. p. 179–183.
- (in German) Friedhelm Ackermann, Alfred Bruns: Burgen und Schlösser und Klöster im Sauerland, Strobel Verlag, 1985, ISBN 978-3877930144
