= Bedburg-Hau =

- Municipality
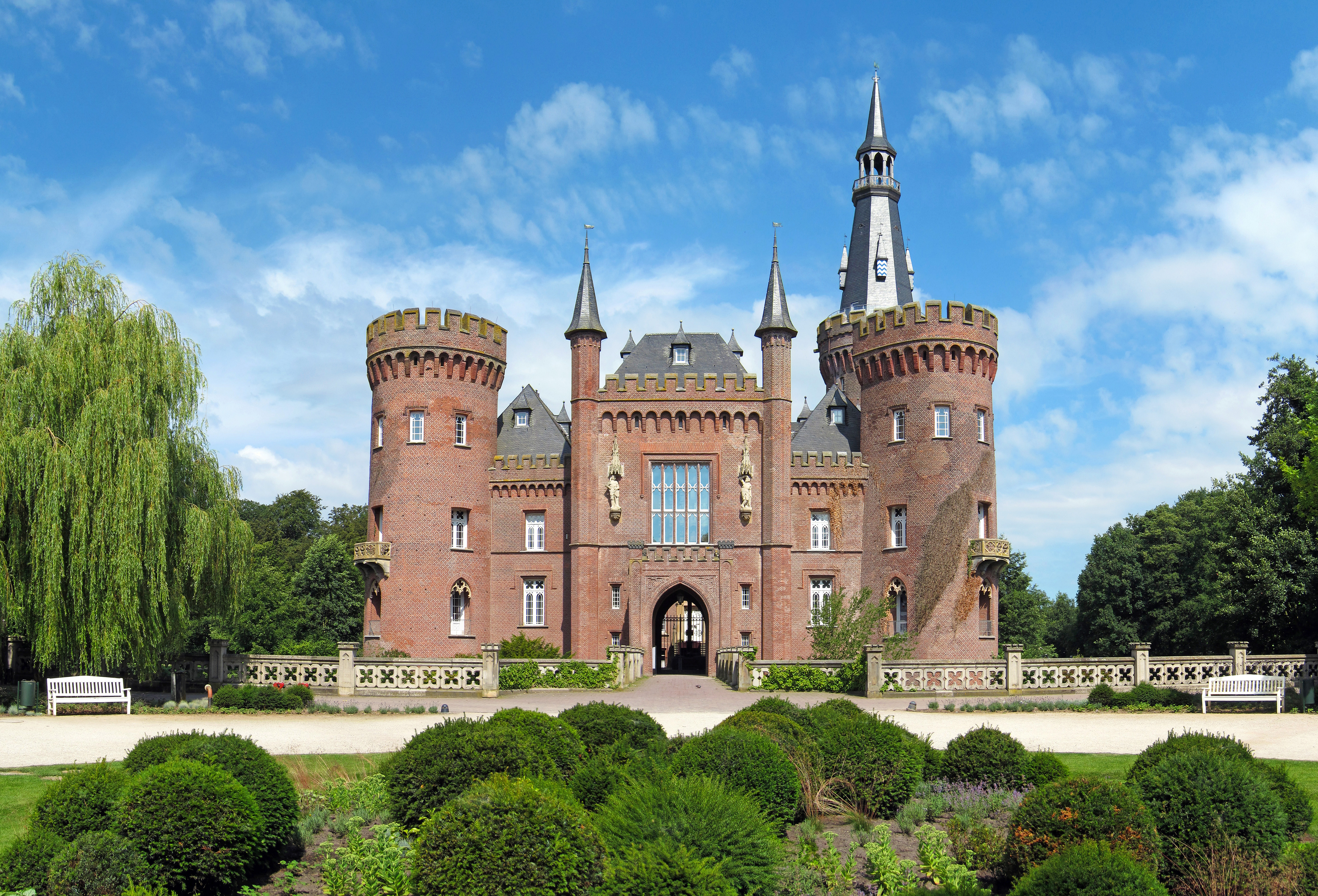
- Moyland Castle in Bedburg-Hau, 2011

- Coat of arms

- Location of Bedburg-Hau within Kleve district
- Interactive map of Bedburg-Hau
- Location within Germany Location within North Rhine-Westphalia
- Coordinates: 51°46′00″N 06°11′00″E
- Country: Germany
- State: North Rhine-Westphalia
- Admin. region: Düsseldorf
- District: Kleve
- Subdivisions: 7

Government
  - Mayor (2025–30): Stephan Reinders (CDU)

Area
  - Total: 61.31 km^{2} (23.67 sq mi)
- Elevation: 20 m (66 ft)

Population (2025-12-31)
  - Total: 13,634
  - Density: 222.4/km^{2} (576.0/sq mi)
- Time zone: UTC+01:00 (CET)
  - Summer (DST): UTC+02:00 (CEST)
- Postal codes: 47551
- Dialling codes: 0 28 21
- Vehicle registration: KLE
- Website: www.bedburg-hau.de

Bedburg-Hau (German pronunciation: [ˈbɛtbʊʁk ˈhaʊ]) is a municipality in the district of Kleve in the state of North Rhine-Westphalia, Germany. It is located approximately 5 km south-east of Kleve.

One of its main attractions is Museum Schloss Moyland, a castle with a museum of modern art dedicated to the German artist Joseph Beuys. The park around the castle has a sculpture garden, herbal gardens and a rose garden. Castle Moyland was first documented in 1307. In the 1740s Frederick of Prussia used the castle to meet with a lover of his. In 1766 it came into possession of the von Steengracht family, and it remained in their possession until 1990 when the foundation Stiftung Museum Schloss Moyland was formed to care for it.

Once a medieval moated castle, the Castle was converted to its current appearance in the 19th century by Cologne Cathedral architect Ernst Friedrich Zwirner, who transformed it in the Gothic Revival style. After being heavily damaged in World War II, it was only after the foundation was established that a comprehensive restoration was initiated, allowing the castle to serve its current purpose. The museum was opened in 1995. The reconstruction of Moyland Schloss was finally completed in 2007 with a topping ceremony when a replica of the historical spire was placed on top of the northtower.

Bedburg-Hau is also home to St. Markus Church, which was built in 1124, and the mausoleum where Prince John Maurice von Nassau-Siegen was initially buried before his bodily remnants were brought to Siegen.

A large area near the railway station is dedicated territory of the mental hospital LVR-Klinik Bedburg-Hau. The terrain was established around 1910, and now has many architectural monuments.

Villages within the municipality of Bedburg-Hau are Hau, Hasselt, Huisberden, Louisendorf, Schneppenbaum, Till-Moyland and Qualburg.

== Population ==
Historical population

Year	Pop.	±% p.a.
1965	12,499	—
1970	13,147	+1.02%
1975	13,130	−0.03%
1980	13,938	+1.20%
1985	13,324	−0.90%
1990	12,328	−1.54%
1995	12,315	−0.02%

Year	Pop.	±% p.a.
2000	12,417	+0.17%
2005	12,926	+0.81%
2010	13,212	+0.44%
2015	13,033	−0.27%
2020	12,973	−0.09%
2025	13,634	+1.00%

Source: Landesdatabank Nordrhein-Westfalen

== Politics ==
The current mayor is Stephan Reinders of the CDU, who has been serving as mayor since 2020. In the 2025 local election, he was reelected with 88,64 % of the vote.

=== City council ===
After the 2025 local elections, the Bedburg-Hau city council is composed as follows:

Party	Votes	%	+/-	Seats	+/-
Christian Democratic Union (CDU)	3,367	53.6	▲4.5	14	▲1
Social Democratic Party (SPD)	1,388	22.1	▲0.4	6	±0
Alliance 90/The Greens (Grüne)	846	13.5	▼6.4	3	▼2
Free Democratic Party (FDP)	686	10.9	▲1.5	3	▲1
Valid votes	6,287	97.0			
Invalid votes	196	3.0			
Total	6,483	100.0		26	±0
Electorate/voter turnout	11,293	57.4			
Source: City of Bedburg-Hau

== Gallery ==
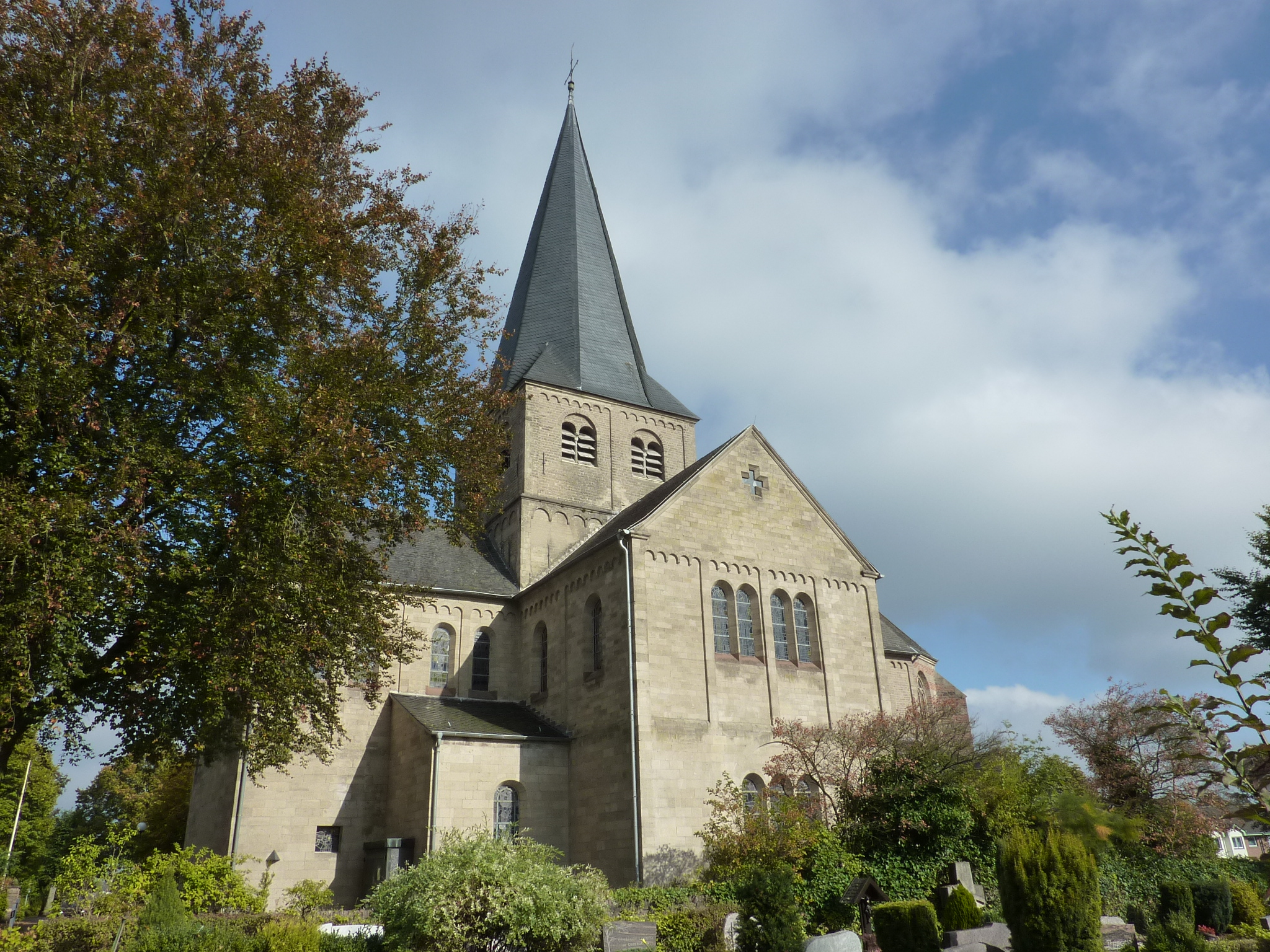
St. Markus, Schneppenbaum

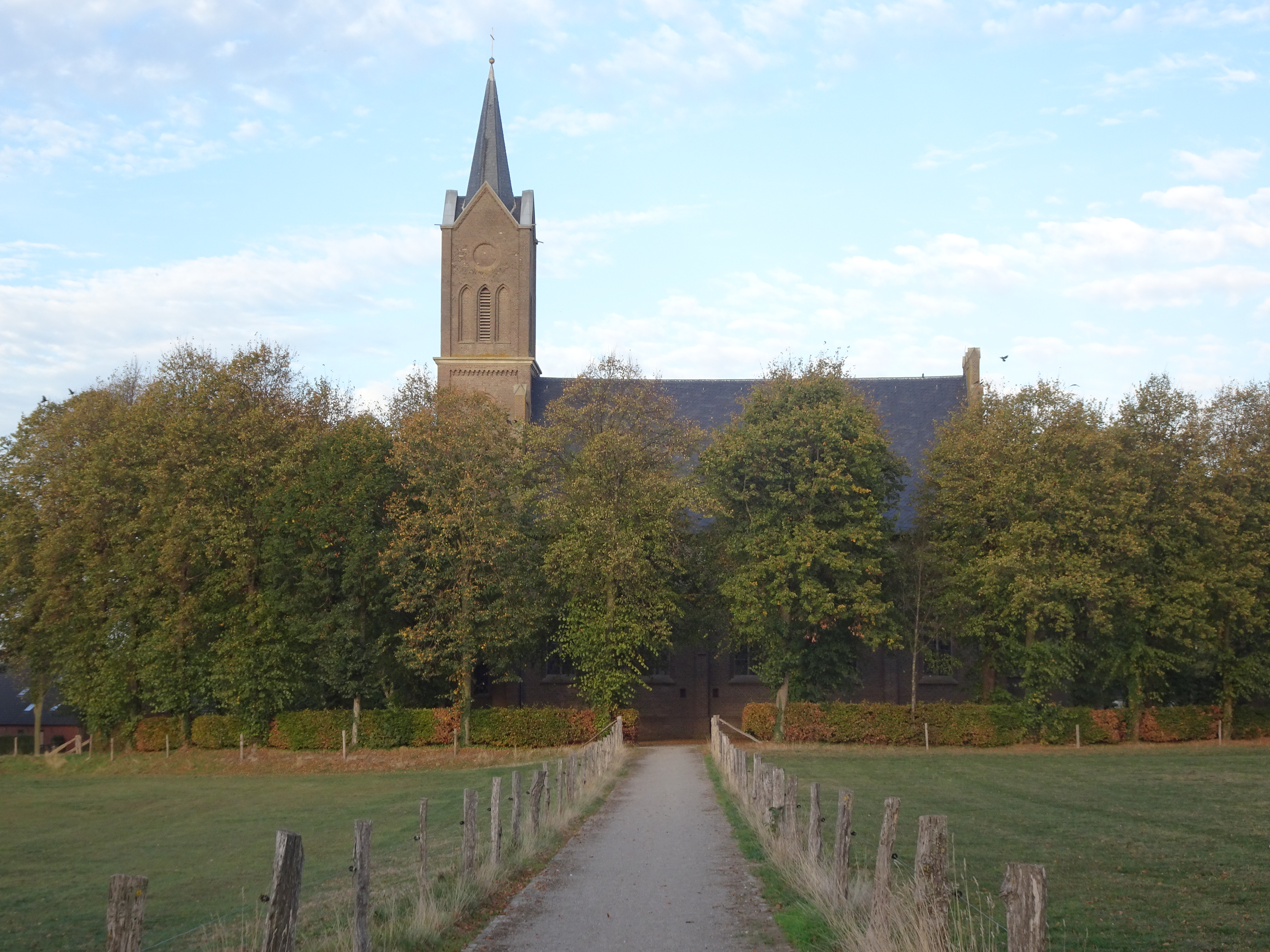
Church Louisendorf

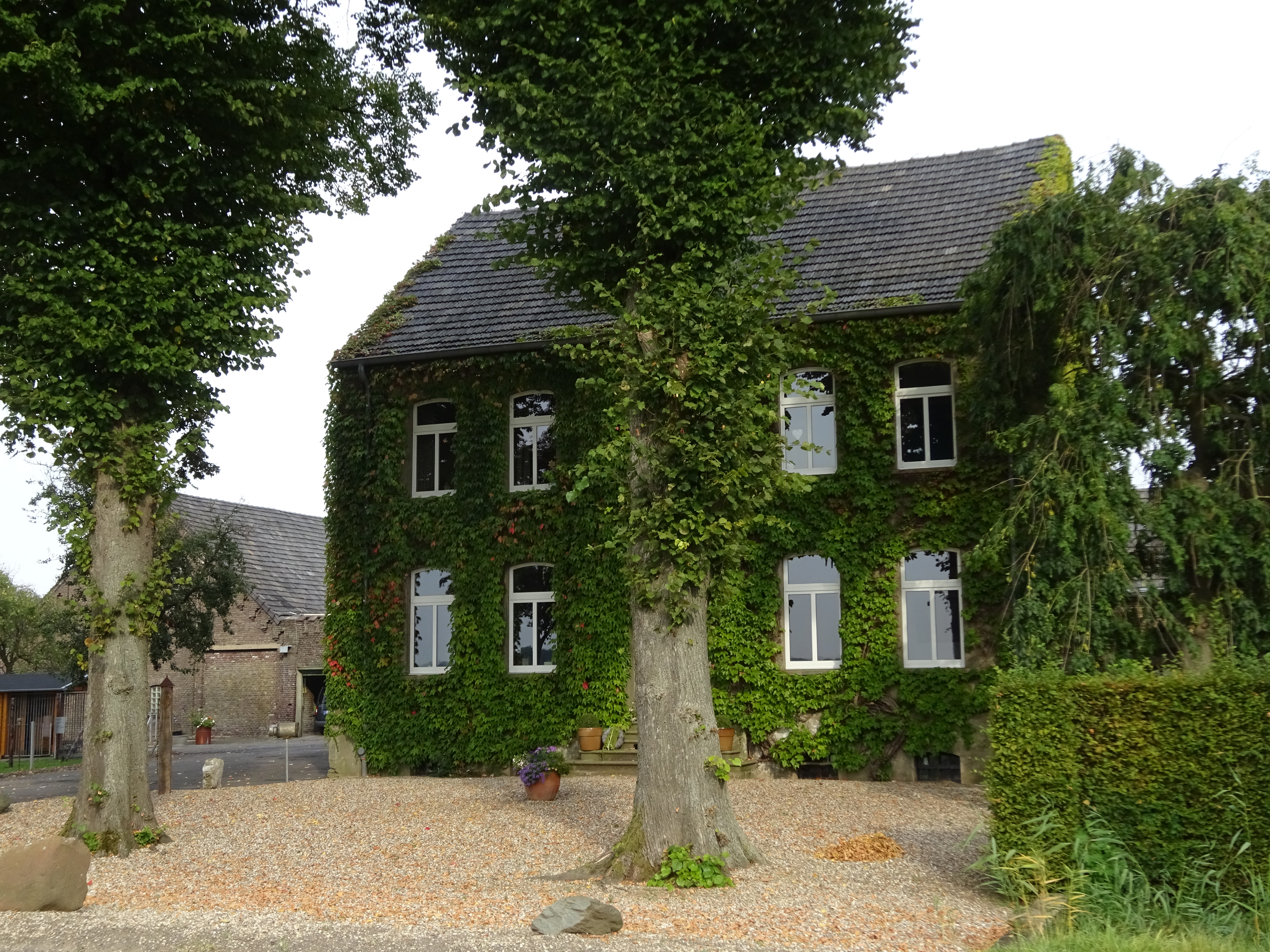
Farmhouse in Qualburg

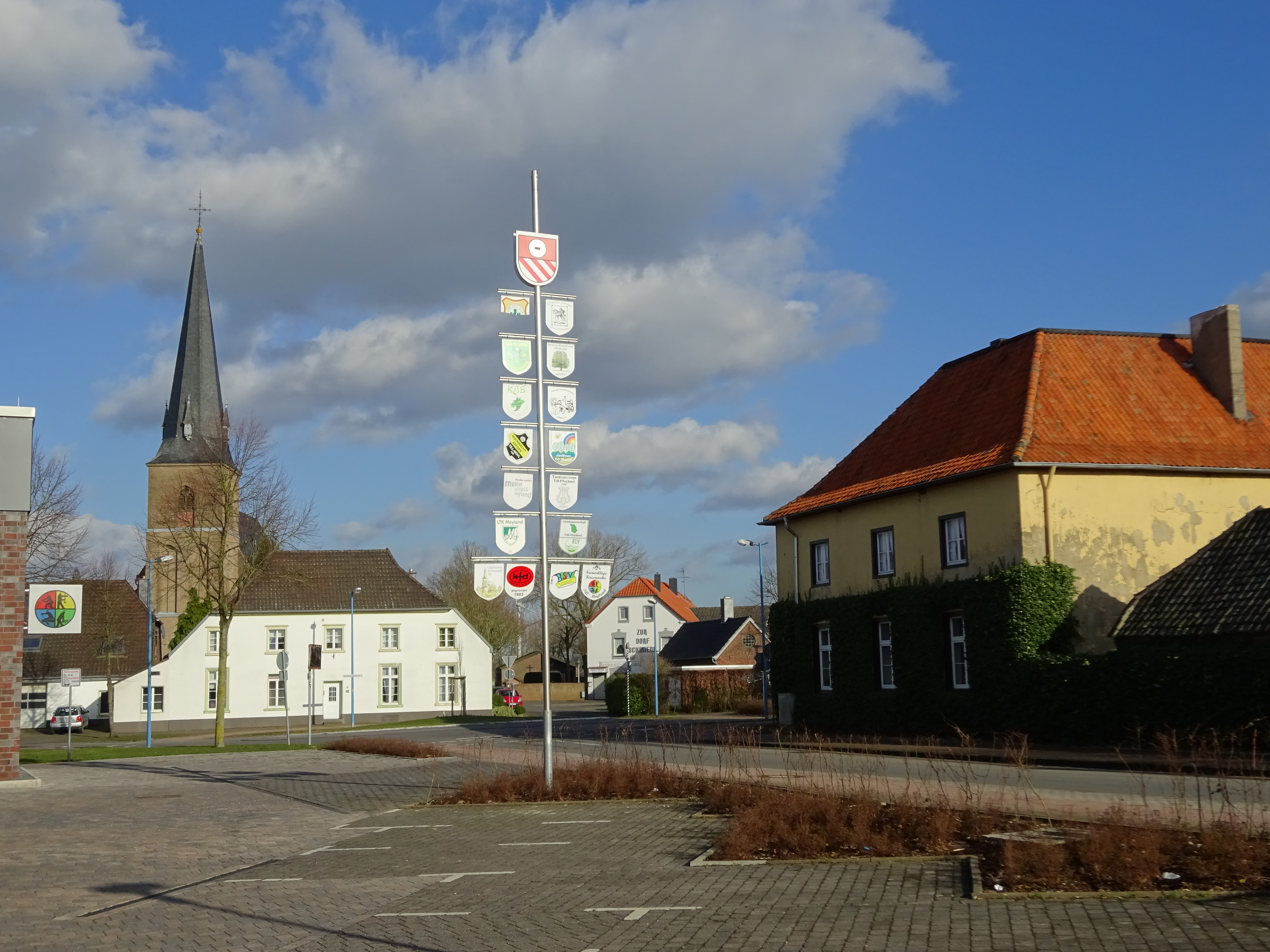
Village center of Till-Moyland

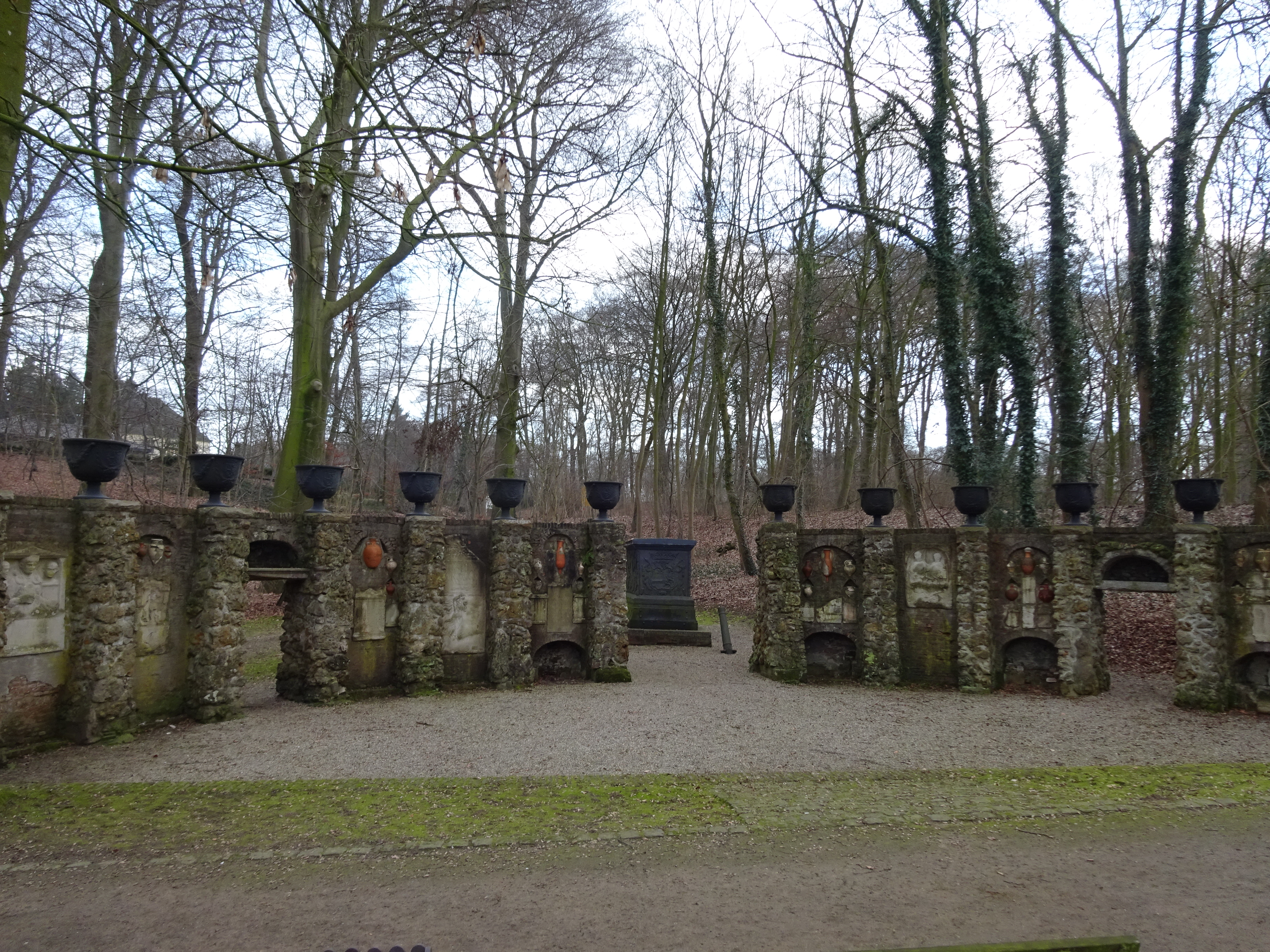
Mausoleum John Maurice von Nassau-Siegen

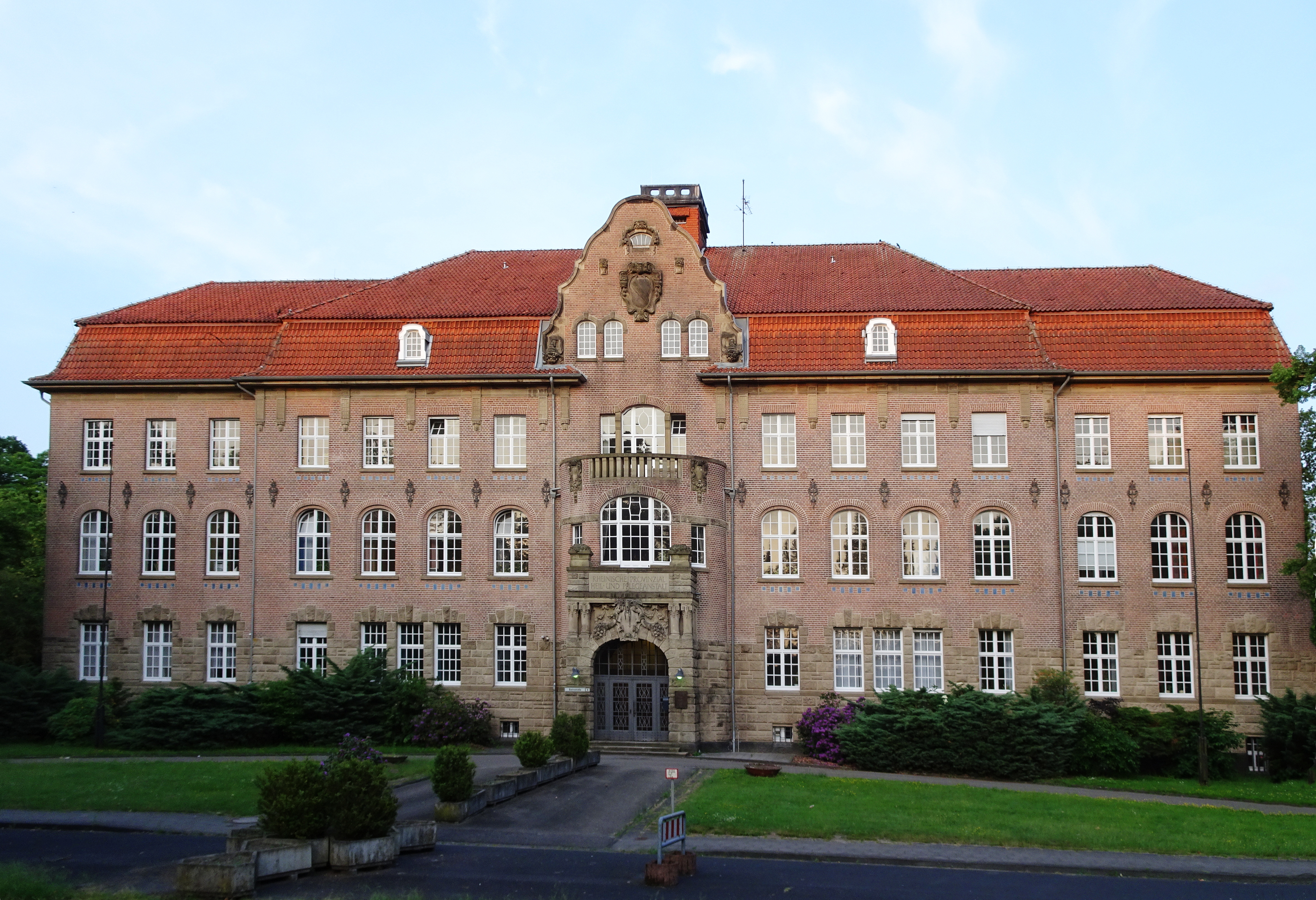
LVR-Klinik Bedburg-Hau
