= Glockengasse Synagogue =

Destroyed synagogue in Cologne, Germany

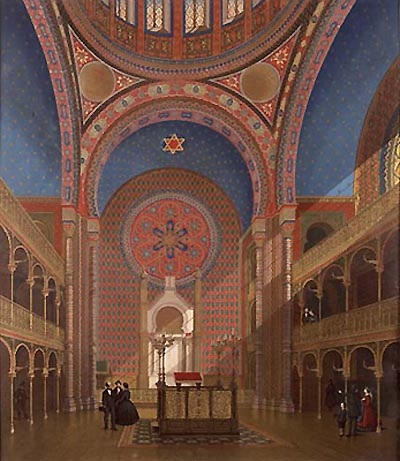
- Interior, chromolithography by J. Hoegg after a watercolor by Carl Emanuel Conrad, c. 1861

- Location of the destroyed synagogue in North Rhine-Westphalia

Religion
- Affiliation: Judaism (former)
- Ecclesiastical or organizational status: Synagogue (1861–1938)
- Status: Destroyed

Location
- Location: Cologne, North Rhine-Westphalia
- Country: Germany
- Interactive map of Glockengasse Synagogue
- Coordinates: 50°56′17″N 6°57′05″E

Architecture
- Architect: Ernst Friedrich Zwirner
- Type: Synagogue architecture
- Style: Moorish Revival
- Funded by: Abraham Oppenheim; Albert von Oppenheim
- Destroyed: November 9, 1938 (on Kristallnacht)

Specifications
- Domes: One central; four smaller
- Dome height (outer): 40 m (130 ft)
- Dome dia. (outer): 10 m (33 ft)

The Synagogue in Glockengasse was a Jewish synagogue, that was located in Cologne, in the state of North Rhine-Westphalia, Germany. Designed by Ernst Friedrich Zwirner in the Moorish Revival style, the synagogue was completed in 1861 and destroyed by Nazis on November 9, 1938, during Kristallnacht.

== Overview ==
Zwirner, the architect of the Cologne Cathedral, built the synagogue on the site of the former Monastery of St. Clarissa, where a modest hall of prayer had been erected in the years of the French occupation and was closed in 1853 because it was unsafe.

On June 10, 1856, after much discussion in the Jewish communal executive board about whether it was better to build a synagogue in the same or a different spot, Abraham Oppenheim, son of Salomon Oppenheim, Jr., announced his readiness to erect a synagogue worthy of the Glockengasse at his own cost as a gift to the community. Drucker-Emden, a member of the Jewish communal administration, supported the decision.

The cornerstone was laid on June 23, 1857. On August 29, 1861, there was a procession from the provisional synagogue on St. Apernstrasse along Breitestrasse and Kolumbastrasse to the new synagogue. The synagogue was dedicated to Rabbi Israel Schwarz. A memorial tablet dedicated to the donor was placed inside and a medal of silver and bronze was struck.

In June 1867, fire damaged the building. In the same year Albert, the son of Simon Oppenheim, Abraham’s brother, and his wife sold a piece of land on the south side of the synagogue and a strip on the east to the Jewish community, making it possible to enlarge the synagogue, erect a smaller synagogue for week-day services, and leave room for a court.

The fiftieth anniversary of the synagogue was celebrated in 1911. During World War I, the large cupola, as well as the smaller ones, were stripped of their original copper covering. The cupolas had been regarded as among the most beautiful in Cologne because of the patinated copper. In consequence of the removal, the four towers on the outside pillars were dismantled and only restored in 1925, while the replacement of the copper covering was postponed for financial reasons.

The synagogue was destroyed during the Kristallnacht on November 9, 1938 together with the other synagogues in Cologne. The modernist Cologne Opera House now occupies the site. A bronze plaque on its façade on Offenbachplatz commemorates the synagogue.

The synagogue has been recreated in virtual form.

== Architecture ==
=== Floor plan ===
It was the first example of a central plan over a Greek cross covered by a dome. The four arms of the cross had the same length, as in Byzantine architecture buildings. Through the association of a cross form with a square room emerged on the corners. The rooms on the side of the façade hold the staircases to the ladies gallery.

The dome was inscribed in the central square, in the middle of which stood the bimah. The central position of the bimah shows that the Jewish community was attached to the old tradition, while the Roonstrasse Synagogue had a new floor plan, that was developed according to the Reform Judaism beliefs.

A low wing of the entrance hall was built with five rooms in front of the square building structure on the street side. The five rooms served as entrance to the staircases to the ladies gallery, as entrance for the men to the main synagogue and a space for the synagogue attendants (Shammes).

=== External architecture ===
A tall, protruding risalit was flanked on both sides by wings and was terminated on top by a merlon rim. Zwirner designed four small, minaret-shaped towers with small cupolas on top of the cornices, in contrast to the Leopoldstädter Tempel in Vienna, in which the towers were crowned by columns.

The rose window in the facade was a neo-Gothic feature. Over the crossing there was a dome with windows all around. At the top was a lantern and an onion cupola. The cupola measured 40 metres (130 feet) in height and 10 m (33 ft) in diameter.

=== Internal architecture ===
The synagogue was, as already mentioned, a central building over a Greek cross, with a dome on top. The four Byzantine cross arms of the same length of the synagogue were all equipped with a barrel vault, in which the truss, the columns and the arches were made of cast iron. Except for the Eastern arm the other three arms were equipped with two floors of ladies galleries, while the Torah ark was placed on the eastern arm, where the wall was decorated with stucco by Josef Hartzheim with rhombus and with a theme of intricate quadrangles and painted by Friedrich Petri of Gießen in blue, red and gold. The stucco work was related to the ones in Alhambra.

The ladies galleries were supported by six columns, that owing to the iron construction had a very fine and graceful form, while the balustrade was decorated with stucco by Hartzheim and painted in gold by Petri. The four large arches, that supported the dome, were decorated by Hartzheim and painted by Petri in the same way as the eastern wall. The dome and the barrel vaults were the only structures that were not covered by stucco. They were painted by Petri in blue and decorated with golden stars.

"The windows were for the most part round, though some had the shape of a trefoil leaf. Through their colored glass a subdued light fell into the room and upon the richly decorated walls and pillars."

The Aaron haKodesch had been made by the Cologne sculptor Stephan, he used Carrara white marble and placed in the middle of the shrine a horse shoe arch. Furthermore, Stephan inserted the capitals from Alhambra and the minaret tower composition with onion cupolas from the façade around the Aaron haKodesch. The water basin of the mikveh in the basement was also made by Stephan, and the same marble was used as for the Torah Ark.

The bimah in the middle of the synagogue room was somewhat higher than usual and stood directly under the cupola. It was surrounded by a parapet of rich woodwork.

== Gallery ==
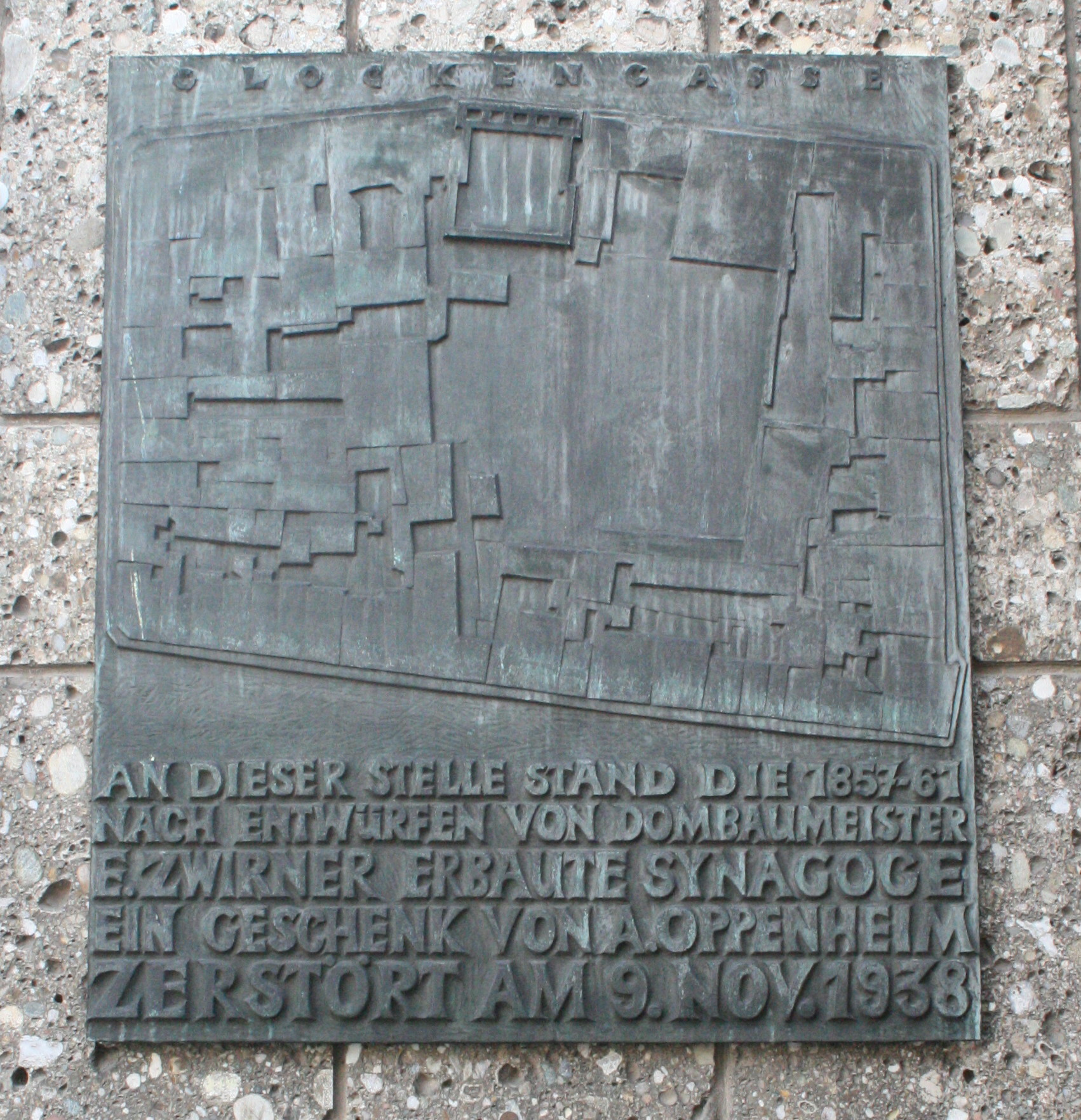
Plaque commemorating the synagogue

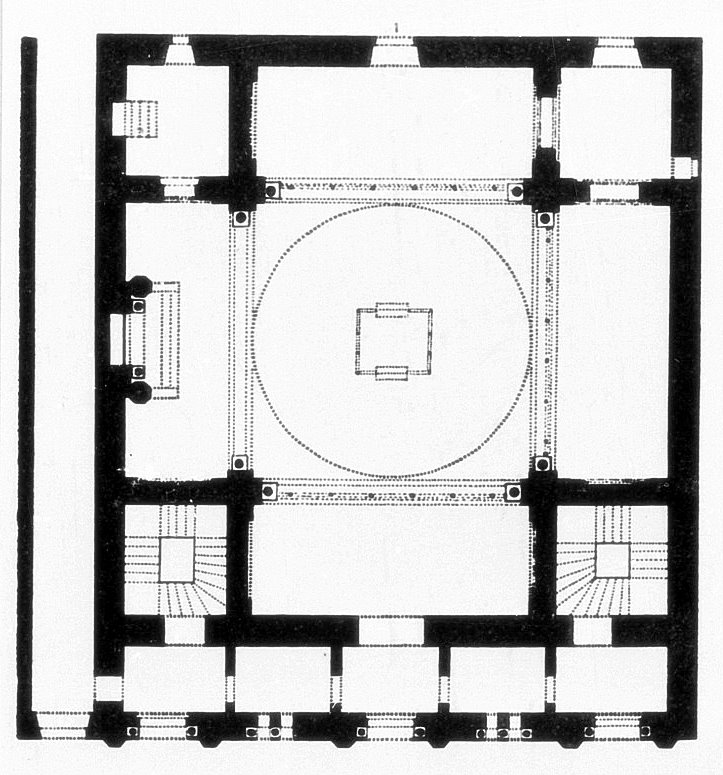
Floor plan of the synagogue

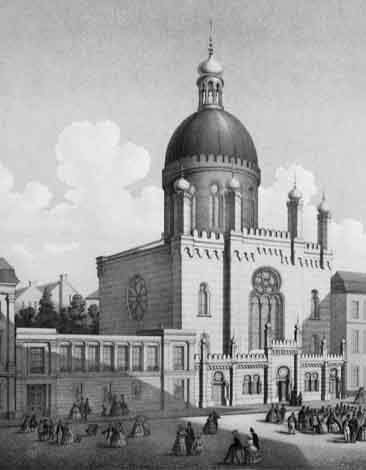
The synagogue during the 1860s

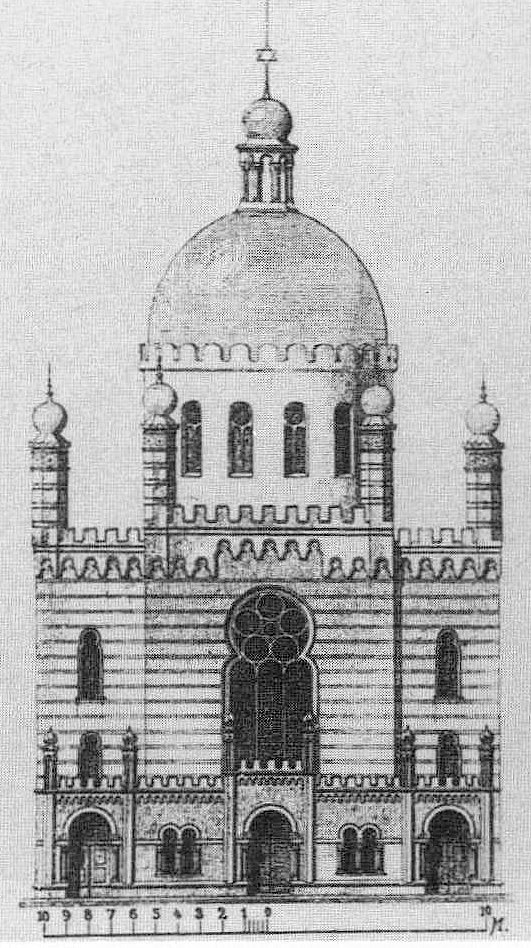
Glockengasse Synagogue

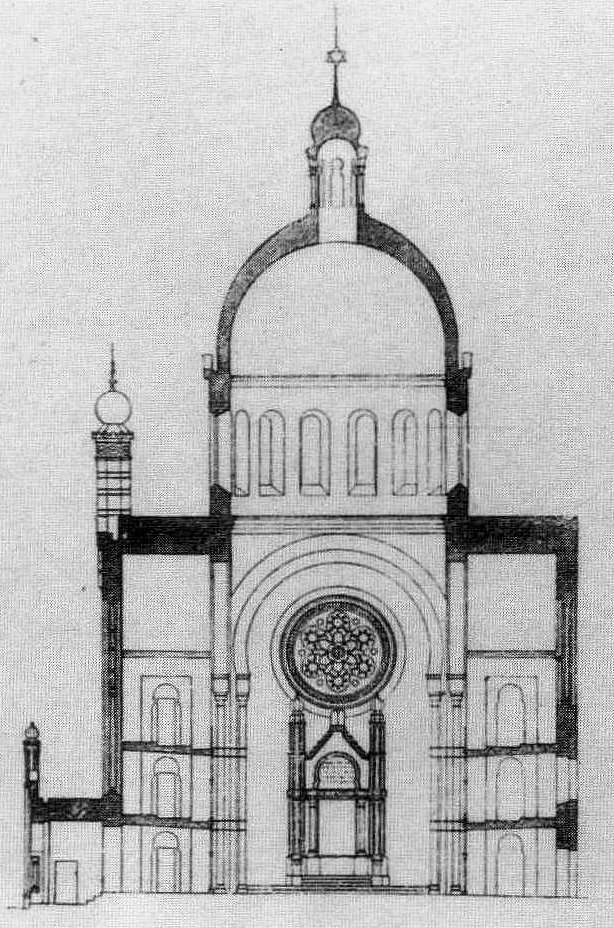
Section

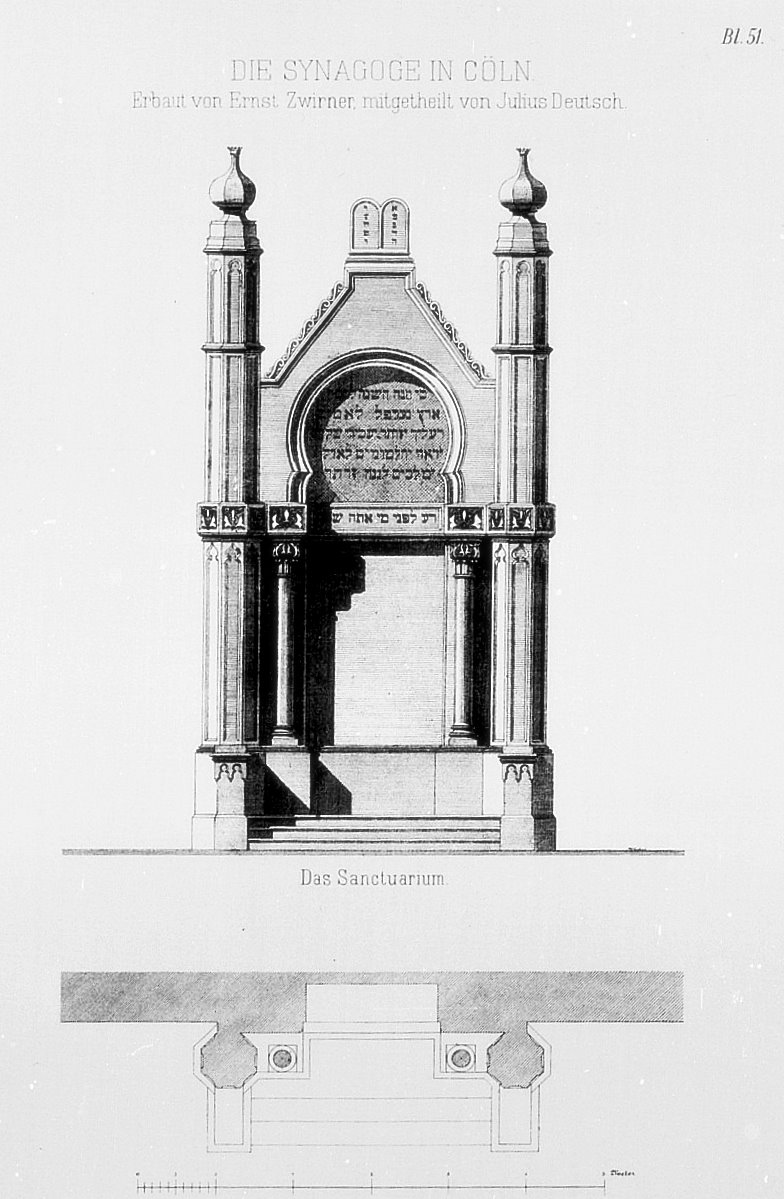
Torah ark

== See also ==
- History of the Jews in Cologne
- List of synagogues in Germany (in German)
