= Carl Emanuel Conrad =

German painter

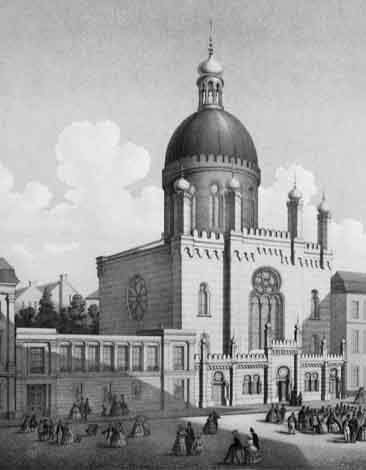
Glockengasse Synagogue, chromolithography by J. Hoegg after an aquarel by Conrad and Anton Meder

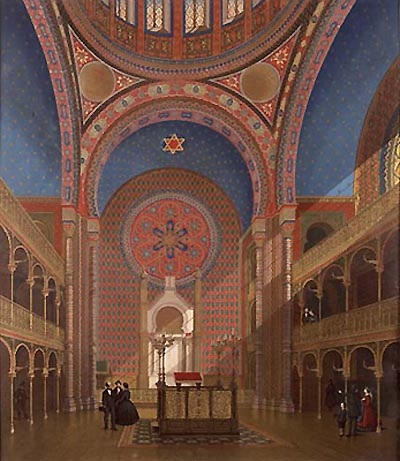
Interior of the Glockengasse Synagogue, chromolithography by Hoegg after an aquarel by Conrad from about 1861

Carl Emanuel Conrad (20 March 1810 – 12 July 1873) was an architectural painter.

He instructed first in Berlin and afterwards at the Kunstakademie Düsseldorf, which he attended from 1835 till 1839. Both in this institution and at the Realschule he gave instruction in perspective to young artists, and received the title of professor, the Order of the Red Eagle, and a medal from the Pope. He painted buildings of the Middle Ages, with landscape surroundings, such as The Church of St. Quirinus in Neuss, The Cloister of St. Severinus in Cologne (1837), The Cathedral of Mayence (1841), Custom House in London (1852) and Views of Cologne Cathedral. He also executed some aquatints, such as Pius IX. in his Cabinet and An Assemblage at Sigmaringen in the Olden Time (1872).

He died in Cologne in 1873.

== See also ==
- List of German painters
