= Moyland Castle =

Castle in Kleve, Germany

Coordinates: 51°45′19″N 6°14′12″E

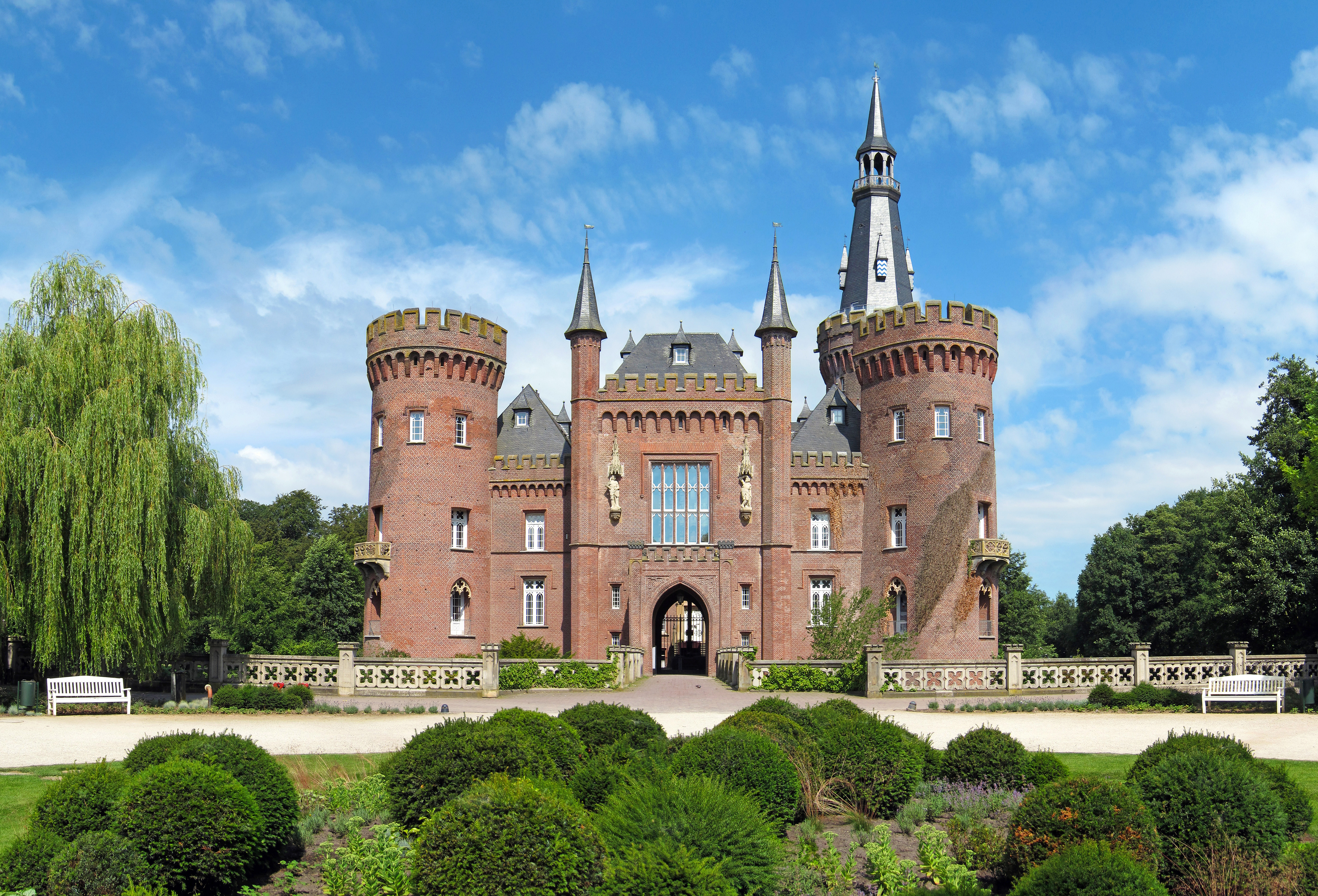
Moyland Castle, 2011

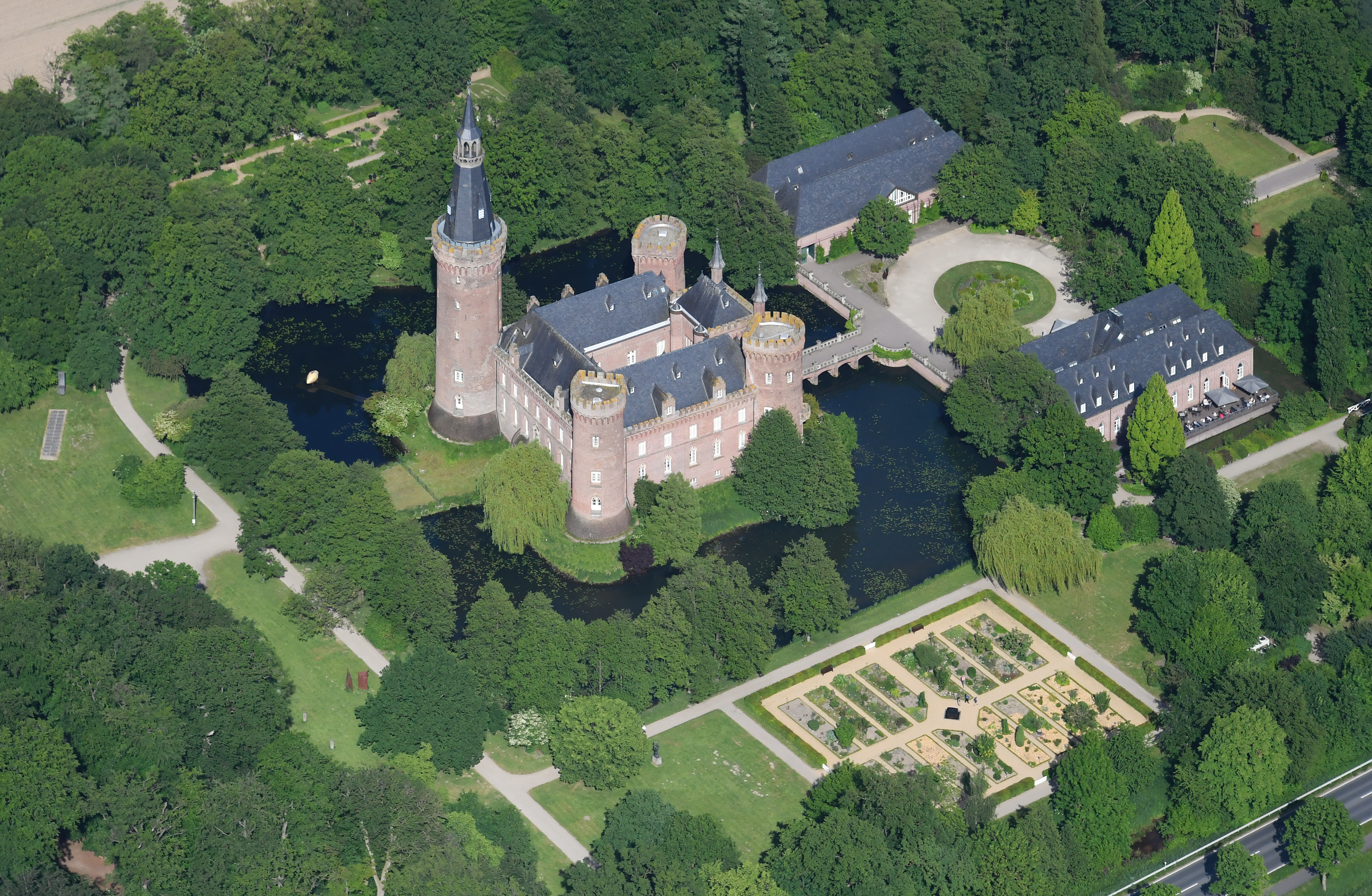
Aerial view of Moyland Castle, 2023

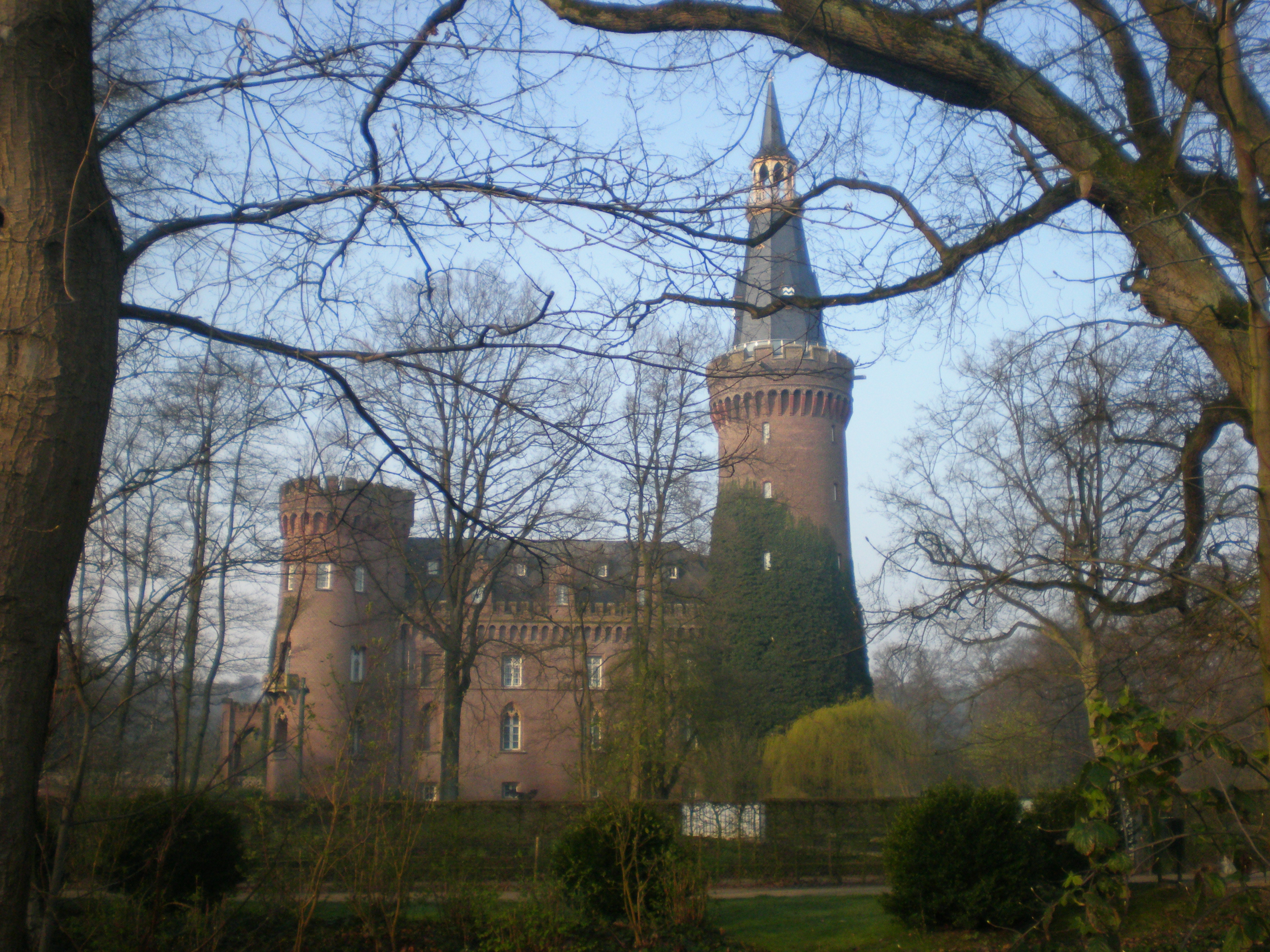
Moyland Castle in April 2008

Moyland Castle (German: Schloss Moyland) is a water castle (moated castle) in Bedburg-Hau in the district of Kleve, one of the most important neo-Gothic buildings in North Rhine-Westphalia. Its name derives from the Dutch word Mooiland which means "beautiful country". The name was probably coined by Dutch workers, brought to the property in 1307 to drain the surrounding wetlands by the then-leaseholder, Jacob van den Eger of the Lower Rhine.

The building is now primarily a museum devoted to exhibiting the world's largest collection of work by artist Joseph Beuys. It is a popular destination on the Lower Rhine.

== Description ==
=== Castle ===
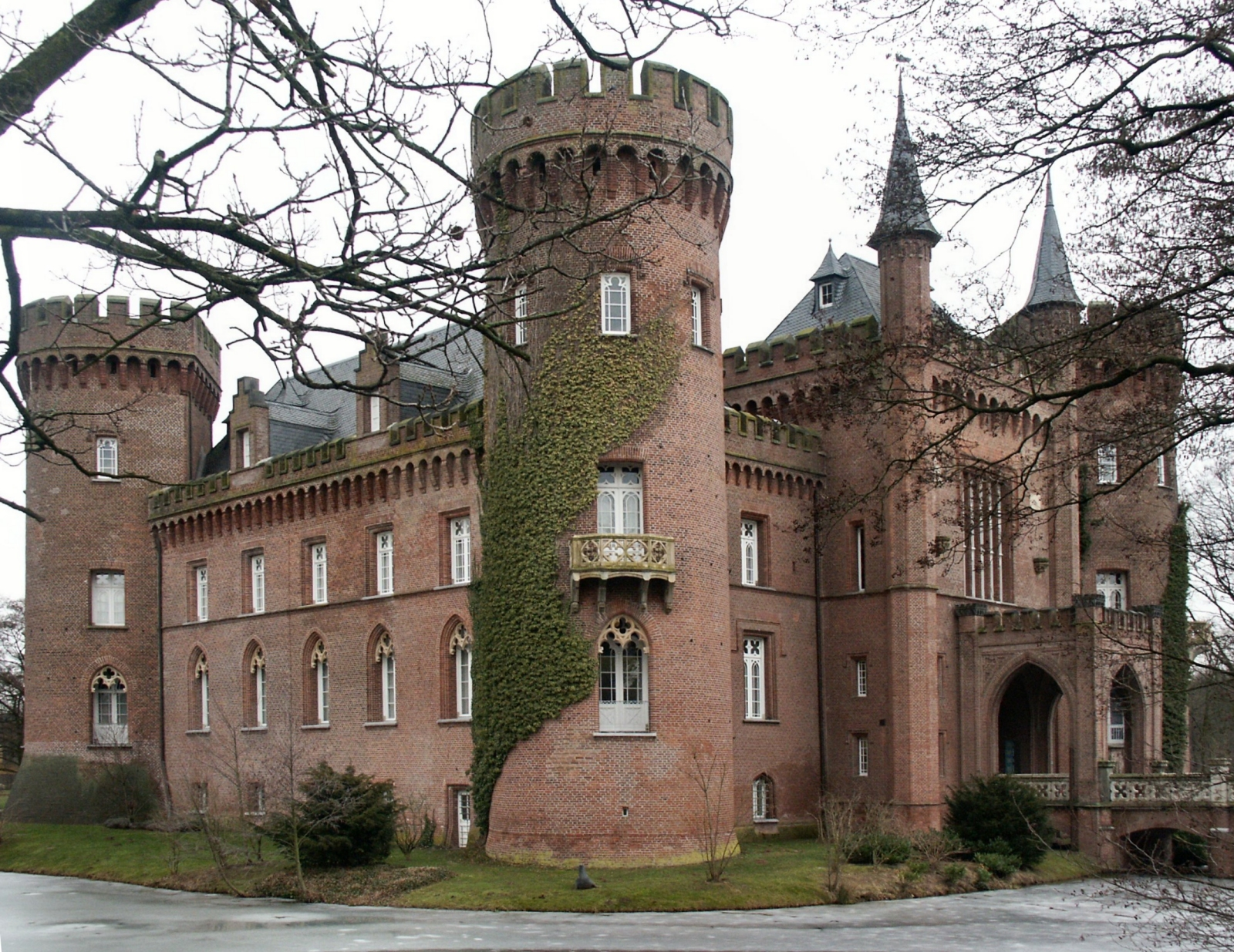
Moyland Castle, view from the south (March 2005)

The palace complex consists of a closed, four-towered main keep, which is southeast of farm buildings in the front. The latter is home to a museum café, museum administration, the library and a space for changing exhibitions. The two-story main building of brick is presented in historicist Tudor style with battlements on corbels. The four floors of the former donjon on the southeast corner of the main keep were in 2008 crowned by a polygonal lantern roof. On the three other corners of the castle are horseshoe-shaped towers with three floors.

The southeast wall of the castle has a gateway formed by two polygonal towers outside with pointed roofs and flanked by two slender, round towers. On the first floor of the wing is the so-called Zwirner Hall, used for concerts and other events.

=== Staircase characters ===
The railings on the stairway to the portal of the main palace are decorated with various animal figures. At the upper end are two lions — they are older originals. At the lower ends of the railing, the original lions were replaced by a wolf on the right and a pug on the left. The wolf was to commemorate the visit of Voltaire. The figure was selected to record for posterity the "ferocity" of the French philosopher in discussion with Frederick II. The pug represents Sir Winston Churchill. During World War II, he visited Moyland Castle in the wake of observing Operation Plunder, the Rhine crossing of the British Army. He was one of the last to visit the intact 200-year-old fortress in which the King of Prussia and Voltaire had their discussions. The palace was looted and the interior largely destroyed shortly after Churchill's visit.

=== Castle park ===
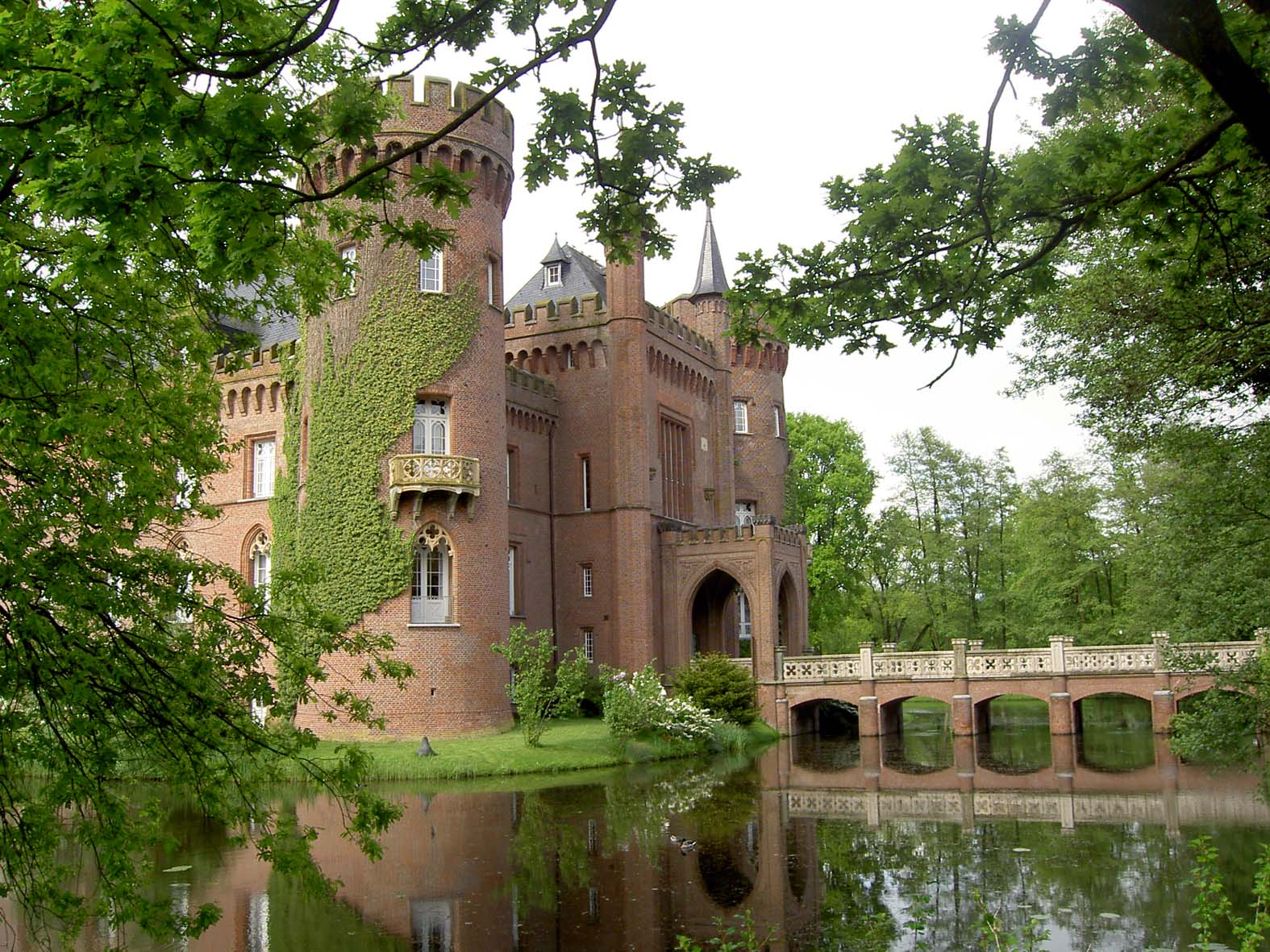
Castle Moyland Bridge

In the period from July 1995 to May 1997 the park was restored under the leadership of Gustav and Rose Woerner of Castle Park, together with the old stand of trees and oak trees and avenues of trees, so that today the appearance reflects the late 19th and early 20th Century. The original architect is not known, but the designs were created in the 1830s/1840s for the family Steengracht. Today, the park features sculptures by contemporary artists from around the world, including James Lee Byars, U We Claus, Hans Karl Burgeff, Eduardo Chillida, Huub Kortekaas, Kubach-Wilmsen, Josef Jaekel, Heinz Mack, Gerhard Marcks, Holger Runge and Antoni Tàpies.

== History ==
=== Residents and owners ===
The first time that a fortified farm called Moyland is documented with ditches and ramparts is 1307. In that year the priest and later Archdeacon of Liège, Jacob van den Eger accepted the investment of Count Otto von Kleve in annual lease. The teacher then later called the children of the count "of Moyland".

Fifteen years later the estate was purchased from Roland von Hagedorn by Dietrich VIII von Kleve who also renewed the fief in 1339. The relevant instrument is the first time that Castle Moyland is documented.

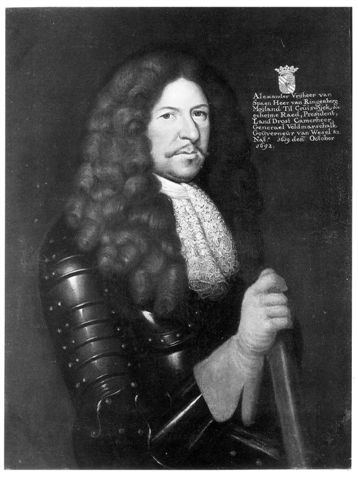
Alexander von Spaen was lord of the manor from 1662

Until the second half of the 17th Century there followed frequent changes of ownership inheritance, which ended in 1662, when the Brandenburg Field Marshal Alexander von Spaen purchased the fief.

His descendant Wilhelm von Spaen sold the now rebuilt castle in 1695 to the then Brandenburg electors, and later Prussian King Friedrich I. He used Moyland primarily as a hunting lodge, and also as a love nest. His affair with the 17-year-old Emmericher citizen's daughter Katharina Rycker was made mention of at the Prussian court.

In 1740 during one of his many stays in the castle the Prussian King Frederick II met with the philosopher Voltaire. Together they developed the idea of "Truth Factory", a philosopher Academy, which should be set up at the Castle Moyland.

In 1766 the estate came into the possession of the Dutch family Steengracht when Adriaan Steengracht received the castle as compensation for loans made to the Prussian royal family in the Seven Years' War.

Moyland remained in a possession within the Steengracht family until 11 July 1990 when the Castle Moyland Museum Foundation was formed with the objective of rebuilding the facility for use as a museum. The owners had long been seeking suitable funding for a rebuild. The decisive impetus for the creation of the Foundation in 1987 was provided by the brothers Franz Joseph van der Grinten and Hans van der Grinten who were looking for a site for their private collection of modern art. On 24 May 1997 the completely renovated buildings and the gardens were reopened.

=== Building history ===
The former fortified farm was redesigned in 1345 to 1355 by Roland von Hagedorn into a classical Gothic castle with a square floor plan. In addition to three round towers it had on the north corner of a more powerful, fourth round tower, which served as a dungeon. From the interior courtyard the third tower was accessible and provided all sorts of comforts, such as a well, toilet, light niches and a fireplace. The western side of the castle was at that time, a great hall, the other sides consisted of walls with battlements. South of the main castle was a bailey, the castle gate through which the main castle was reached.

In the 15th century in the courtyard of the main castle building new wings were built and a decorated chapel was added in the east tower.

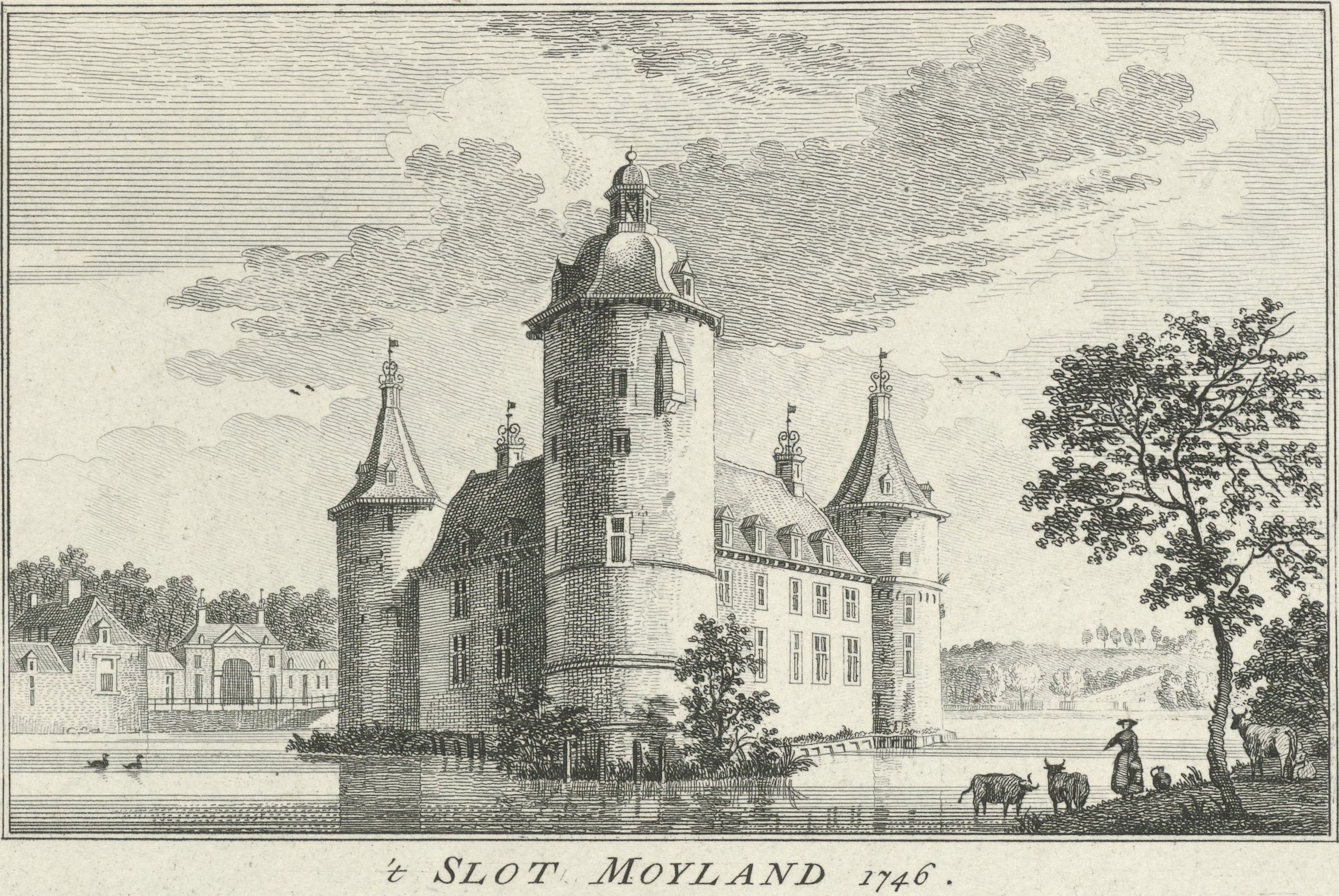
Moyland Castle in 1746

Alexander Baron von Spaen had the medieval fortifications expanded and rebuilt in 1662 as a baroque castle styled like the buildings from the capital city of Kleve by Pieter Post. Since only a year before the renovation work at Castle Ringberg was completed, you can still today see architectural parallels between the two castles. The basement rooms received new, concave sides and the floor heights were changed. Also, the main castle windows were arranged symmetrically and the approaching roads were moved so that they led axially towards the main house.

Under Johann Nikolaus von Steengracht from 1854 to 1862 a remodeling of the exterior was done in the Gothic Revival style. The Baroque interior was maintained largely untouched during the work under the Cologne Cathedral architect Ernst Friedrich Zwirner. The castle walls were covered with red brick and the three corner towers were fitted with battlements and pointed windows. The keep was set up with a historicist pointed roof. The gateway also experienced a reorganization and was made accessible via a newly-built stone bridge. In the course of this work, the fore-castle was rebuilt on the foundation of its predecessor.

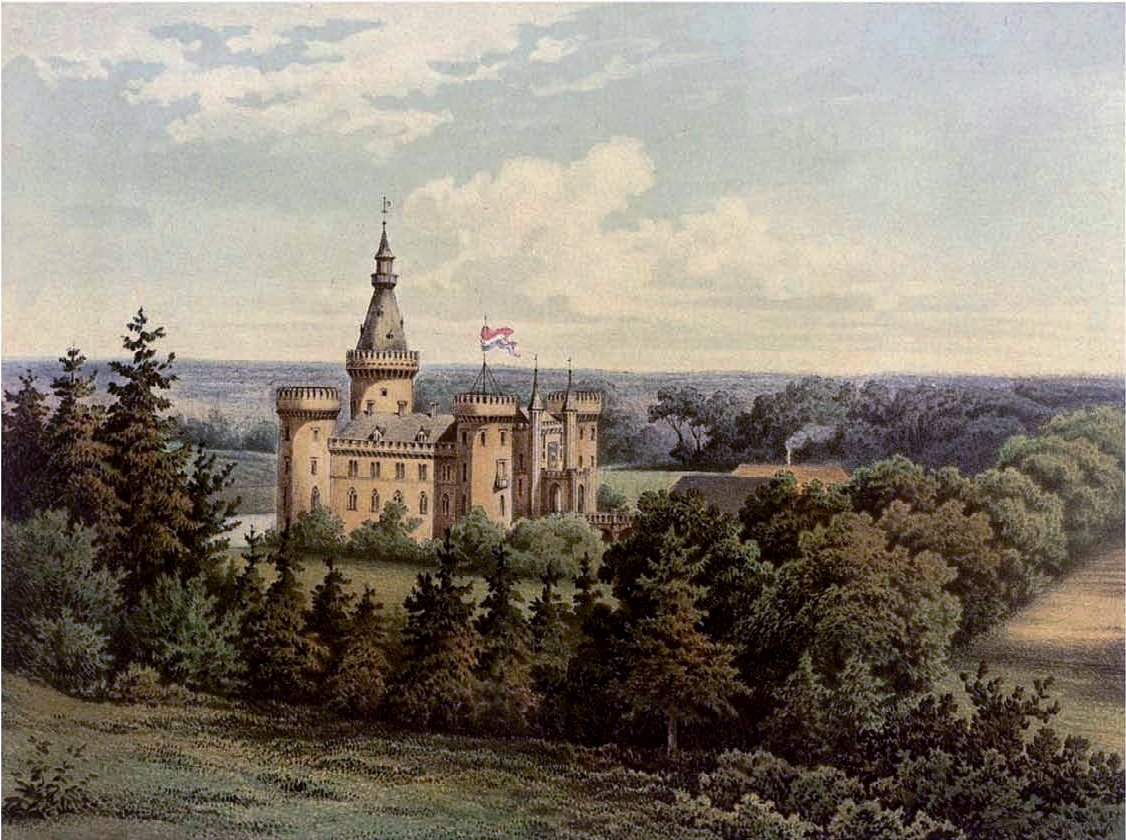
Lithograph of Moyland Castle from the collection of Alexander Duncker

In addition, the builder replanted the parks in the "mixed style" of that time. In this can be found in the style of an English landscape garden and baroque structures typical of the so-called "architectural garden". Because of their importance, the park was in 2004 added to the tourist route Strasse der Gartenkunst (Road of Garden Art).

The castle survived the last battles of the Second World War relatively unscathed, until the arrival of the Allies on February 25, 1945. Field Marshal Bernard Montgomery took the castle as his headquarters. In this period Winston Churchill also came to Moyland. After they left, almost all of the sumptuous interior underwent theft and vandalism by Canadian soldiers, and the castle was devastated. The castle's owner, Gustav Adolf Steengracht von Moyland, was Joachim von Ribbentrop's state secretary and was tried for war crimes by the Americans, but in January 1950 he was granted amnesty and freed. A temporary repair was done in 1954, but a fire in the western roof truss in 1956 caused damage; despite a temporary roof, the buildings gradually fell into disrepair.

1987 began with repairs to restore the buildings. From 1990 to 1997 the newly-formed Foundation Museum Schloss Moyland had responsibility for the restoration and extension of the historic buildings and a modern redesign of the rooms of the interior for use as a museum.

== Museum ==
The castle buildings now house the art collection of the brothers Hans van der Grinten and Franz Joseph van der Grinten, collected over 50 years. The extensive collection includes exhibits from the 19th and 20th Century, including works by Erwin Heerich, Willem den Ouden, Rudolf Schoofs and Hermann Teuber. A major focus of the comprehensive collection of works by Joseph Beuys which consists of nearly 5000 pieces and thus is the world's largest collection of his work. Several previously unpublished drawings in the exhibition "Energy Plan" are presented, from 5 September 2010 to 20 March 2011 in the rooms of the castle.

In a specialized Joseph Beuys Archive, in co-operation with the Düsseldorf Art Academy, about 200,000 archival records and documents related to the life and work of the artist are kept.

There is also an extensive art library of more than 60,000 items concerning art history from 1800 until now, with an emphasis on the cultural history of the Lower Rhine region.

=== 2011 redesign ===
The palace building was closed for refurbishment in October 2010 for about a year. The castle re-opened in September 2011 with a new thematic concept and complete interior redesign by architects Hilmer & Sattler and Albrecht. The bulk of the museum is now devoted to exhibiting the Beuys collection, with space for special exhibitions and cultural events.
