= David Levi Elkan =

German engraver (1808–1865)

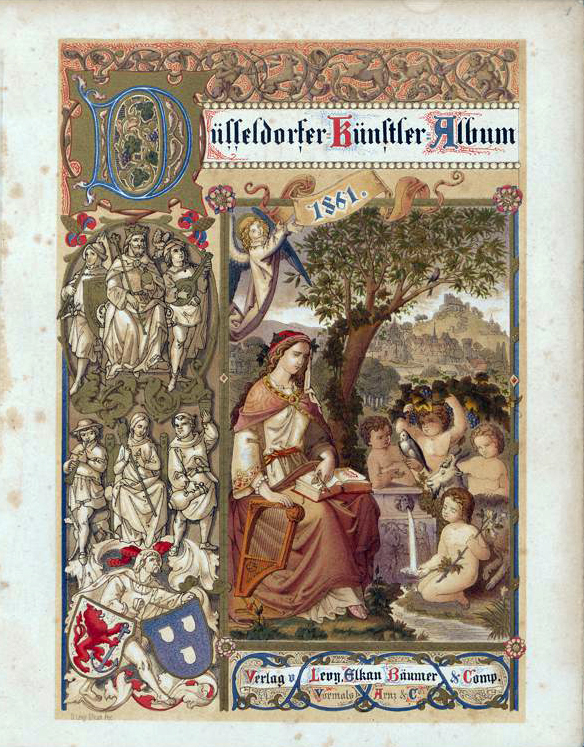
An engraving by Elkan

David Levi Elkan (1808–1865) was a Jewish German engraver.

Active in Cologne as a book illustrator and artist, he worked on the Cologne Cathedral. During the 1848 Revolution, he was active in the Cologne national guard, fighting for emancipation along with many other Jews.
