= Fygen Lutzenkirchen =

German merchant

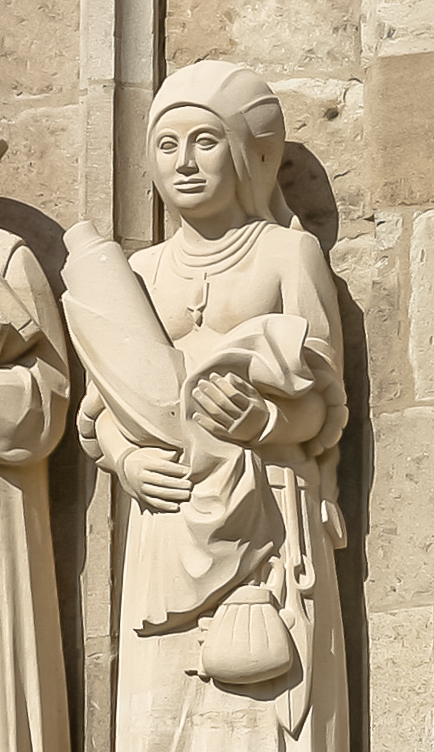
Fygen Lutzenkirchen

Fygen Lutzenkirchen (1450–1515) was a German merchant. She managed a major silk trading house in Cologne. She was elected Mistress (Master) of the Silk Weaving Guild. She is now a locally famous historical figure, with several memorials of her now present in Cologne.

== History ==
Fygen Lutzenkirchen was an important figure within the silk makers' guild, one of the 'Cologne Women's Guilds'. Focused primarily on exports, these guilds contributed to the silk industry's notable success around 1500. This industry, which held a monopoly on silk fabric production in Cologne, was among the city's most prosperous sectors. In the Middle Ages, only Cologne and Paris had guilds predominantly composed of women.

In 1474, Fygen Lutzenkirchen was recognized as a master in her craft, and by 1497, she had trained 25 apprentices. Her own daughters, however, were apprenticed to her peers within the guild for their education. Fygen held the position of guild master six times. She was married to Peter Lutzenkirchen, a prominent merchant and councilor. The couple led the "Silk Office" for almost twenty years, supporting each other in their entrepreneurial ventures. Peter notably contributed to the business by importing raw silk for his wife's operation.

Upon her husband's passing in 1498, Fygen Lutzenkirchen withdrew from her active involvement in the silk trade. She devoted herself to managing her late husband's estate and ventured into the wine and drugstore merchandise trade. It is probable that their daughter Lisbeth, who had been accredited as a master silk maker since 1496 and was married into a wealthy textile family, took over the family business. Lisbeth's mother-in-law, Trynken Imhof, alongside Fygen, was among the leading silk producers in Cologne. By 1515, Fygen ranked among Cologne's wealthiest individuals and was one of the city's six richest women. She owned multiple properties in Cologne, including the historic Wolkenburg estate. The exact date of her death remains unknown.
