= List of German Righteous Among the Nations =

As of 1 January 2022, Yad Vashem recognised 651 Righteous Among the Nations from Germany.

== A ==
- Elisabeth Abegg (1882–1974), recognised 1967
- Willi Ahrem (1902–1967), recognised 1965
- Maria and Adolf Althoff (1913–1998), recognised 1995
- Ruth Andreas-Friedrich (1901–1977), recognised 2002
- Aurelius Arkenau (1900–1991), recognised 1998
- Hugo Armann (1917–1989), recognised 1985
- Heinrich Aschoff (1893–1958), recognised 1965

== B ==
- Leonard Bartlakowski (1916–1953), recognised 1979
- Cläre Barwitzky (1913–1989), recognised 1991
- Albert Battel (1891–1952), recognised 1981
- Gitta Bauer (1919–1990), recognised 1985
- Katharina Bayerwaltes (1914–2011), recognised 2006
- Berthold Beitz (1913–2013), recognised 1973
- Else Beitz (1920–2014), recognised 2006
- Rudolf Bertram (1893–1975), recognised 1979
- Willi Bleicher (1907–1981), recognised 1965
- Marie and Adolph Kurt Böhm (1926–present), recognised 1994
- Marie Burde (June 9, 1892 – July 12, 1963), recognised 2012
- Otto Busse (1901–1980), recognised 1968

== C ==
- Hans Georg Calmeyer (1903–1973), recognised 1992
- Joseph Sebastian Cammerer (1892–1983), recognised 1969
- Eva Cassirer (1920–2009), recognised 2011 alongside her mother Hanna Sotschek
- Sibylla Cronenberg, recognised 2006

== D ==
- Luise and Alfred Dilger (1897–1975), recognised 1991
- Hildehard and Theodor Dipper (1903–1969), recognised 2008
- Hans von Dohnanyi (1902–1945), recognised 2003
- Paul (1880–1954), Elfriede and Heinz Drossel (1916–2008), recognised 1999
- Georg Ferdinand Duckwitz (1904–1973), recognised 1971

== E ==
- Johanna Eck (1888–1979), recognised 1973
- Gottfried von Einem (1918–1996), recognised 2002
- Joseph Emonds (1898–1975), recognised 2013

== F ==
- Hans Fittko, husband of Lisa Fittko; recognised 2000
- Elisabeth Flügge (1895–1983), recognised 1976
- Evert Baron Freytag von Loringhoven, recognised 1967
- Karin Friedrich (1925–2015), recognised 2004
- Otto Ernst Fritsch (b. 1908), recognised 1975
- Wolfgang Frommel (1902–1986), recognised 1973
- Kurt and Herta Fuchs, recognised 1995

== G ==
- Karl Max and Auguste Gehre (1898–1972), recognised 1988
- Richard (1887–1975) and Hildegard Gölz (1892–1986), recognised 1991
- Theodor Görner (1884–1971), recognised 1967
- Elisabeth Goes (1911–2007), recognised 1991
- Hermann Friedrich Graebe (1900–1986), recognised 1965
- Georg (1904–1944) and Anneliese Groscurth (1910–1996), recognised 2005
- Heinrich Grüber (1891–1975), recognised 1964
- Klara Grüger (1912–1999), recognised 1986
- Marie Grünberg (1903–1986), recognised 1984
- Heinz Gützlaff (1905–1961), recognised 2017
- Emma Gumz (1899–1981), recognised 1971

== H ==
- Wilhelm Hammann (1897–1955), recognised 1984
- Albert and Loni Harder, recognised 1966
- Hans Hartmann (1896–1970), recognised 1963
- Robert Havemann (1910–1982), recognised 2005
- Fritz Heine (1904–2002), recognised 1986
- Josef Heinen (1898–1989), recognised 1969
- Heinrich Held (1897–1957), recognised 2003
- Donata Helmrich (1900–1986), wife of Eberhard Helmrich; recognised 1986
- Eberhard Helmrich (1899–1969), husband of Donata Helmrich; recognised 1965
- Marie Luise Hensel (1894–1942), recognised 1972
- Herbert Herden (1915–2009), recognised 2004
- Eva Hermann (1900–1997) and Carl Hermann (1898–1961), recognised 1976
- Josef and Elise Höfler (1912–1991), recognised 2001
- Helene and Joseph Höffner (1906–1987), recognised 2003
- Lisa Holländer, recognised 1971
- Helene Holzman (1891–1968), recognised 2005
- Wilhelm Hosenfeld (1895–1952), recognised 2008
- Stephanie Hüllenhagen (1893–1967), recognised 2001
- Kreszentia Hummel (1907–2002), recognised 2015

== I ==
- Frieda Impekoven (b. 1880), recognised 1966

== J ==
- Helene Jacobs (1906–1993), recognised 1983
- Michael Jovy (1920–1984), recognised 1982
- Jean Jülich (1929–2011), recognised 1982

== K ==
- Margarete and Fritz Kahl (1895–1974), recognised 2006
- Helmut Kleinicke (1907–1979), recognised 2018
- Max Kohl (1881–1976), recognised 1969
- Walter Kraemer (1892–1941), recognised 1999
- Johanna and Lothar Kreyssig (1898–1986), recognised 2016
- Werner Krumme (1909–1972), recognised 1964
- Gerhard Kurzbach (b. 1915), recognised 2011

== L ==
- Alfred Leikam (1915–1992), recognised 2002
- Bernhard Lichtenberg (1875–1943), recognised 2004
- Max Liedtke (1894–1955), recognised 1993
- Maria and Heinrich List (1882–1942), recognised 1992
- Gertrud Luckner (1900–1995), recognised 1966

== M ==
- Hermann Maas (1877–1970), recognised 1964
- Erich Mahrt (1910–1988), recognised 2016
- Maria von Maltzan (1909–1997), recognised 1987
- Gerhard Marquardt (1904–1983), recognised 1985
- Max Maurer (1891–1972), recognised 1995
- Luise Meier (1895–1979), recognised 2001
- Wilhelm Mensching (1885–1964), recognised 2001
- Margarete Meusel (1897–1953), recognised 2006
- Heinrich Middendorf (1898–1972), recognised 1994
- Maimi von Mirbach (1899–1984), recognised 1981
- Gertrud and Otto Mörike (1897–1978), recognised 1970
- Richard Ernst Moser (1885–1967), recognised 2001
- Fritz Müller, recognised 1984

== N ==
- Max Naujocks (1894–1963), recognised 2011
- Hilde and Joseph Neyses (1893–1988), recognised 1981
- Fritz Niermann (1898–1976), recognised 1985

== O ==
- Heint (1897–1989) and Josephine Odenthal (1902–1984), recognised 2006
- Charlotte and Erhard Oewerdieck, recognised 1978
- Friedrich Carl von Oppenheim (1900–1978), recognised 1996
- Maria and Josef Otten, recognised 2015
- Katharina Overath (1926–1995), recognised 1990 alongside her parents Albert and Maria Meier

== P ==
- Hubert Pentrop (born 1895), recognised 1965
- Stephan Hubertus Pfürtner (1922–2012), recognised 2006
- Karl Plagge (1897–1957), recognised 2004
- Dorothee and Harald Poelchau (1903–1972), recognised 1971
- Lilli (1883–1946) and Manfred Pollatz (1886–1964), recognised 2013
- Hedwig Porschütz (1900–1977), recognised 2012 alongside her mother Hedwig Völker

== R ==
- Gerhard Radke (1914–1999), recognised 1977
- Eberhard Rebling (1911–2008), recognised 2007
- Irmgard and Friedrich Reck-Malleczewen (1884–1945), recognised 2014
- Paul Rentsch (1989–1944), recognised 2005
- Herbert Richter (1901–1944), recognised 2005
- Grete Rönnfeldt (1901–1981), recognised 2003
- Alfred Roßner (1906–1943), recognised 1995
- Eduard Rügemer (1883–1955), recognised 2012
- August Ruf (1869–1944), recognised 2004

== S ==
- August Sapandowski (1882–1945), recognised 2001
- Hildegard Schaeder (1902–1984), recognised 2000
- Elisabeth Schiemann (1881–1972), recognised 2014
- Oskar (1908–1974) and Emilie Schindler (1907–2001), recognised 1993
- Barthel Schink (1927–1944), recognised 1982
- Änne Schmitz (born 1906), recognised 2004
- Elisabeth Schmitz (1893–1977), recognised 2011
- Oskar Schönbrunner (1908–2004), recognised 1977
- Karl (Sr), Katharina, Karl (Jr) and Martha Schörghofer, recognised 1968
- Gustav Schröder (1885–1959), recognised 1993
- Hanning Schröder (1896–1987), recognised 1978
- Eduard Schulte (1891–1966), recognised 1988
- Konrad Schweser (1899–1975), recognised 1968
- Kurt Seligmann (1896–1967), recognised 2006
- Helmuth and Annemarie Sell, recognised 1981
- Bernhard Sickmann, recognised 1965
- Heinrich Silkenbömer, recognised 1965
- Hans Söhnker (1903–1981), recognised 2017
- Margarete Sommer (1893–1965), recognised 2003
- Hans Stockmar (1890–1961), recognised 2001
- Fritz Strassmann (1902–1980), recognised 1985
- Utje and Friedrich Strindberg (1897–1978), recognised 2001
- Bernhard Südfeld, recognised 1965
- Werner Sylten (1893–1942), recognised 1979
- Isolde and Horst Symanowski (1911–2009), recognised 2002
- Frieda Szturmann (1897–1962), recognised 2013

== T ==
- Gina and Edwin Tietjens (1894–1944), recognised 1997
- Ilse Totzke (1913–1987), recognised 1995

== W ==
- Hans Walz (1883–1974), recognised 1969
- Ludwig Walz (1898–1989), recognised 1974
- Armin T. Wegner (1886–1978), recognised 1967
- Otto Weidt (1883–1947), recognised 1971
- Agnes (1891–1946) and Ruth Wendland (1913–1977), recognised 1975
- Ludwig Wörl (1906–1967), recognised 1963
- Lilly Wust (1913–2006), recognised 1995

== Z ==
- Joachim von Zedtwitz (1910–2001), recognised 1994
- Konrat Ziegler (1884–1974), recognised 2000
