= Prężynka =

- Village
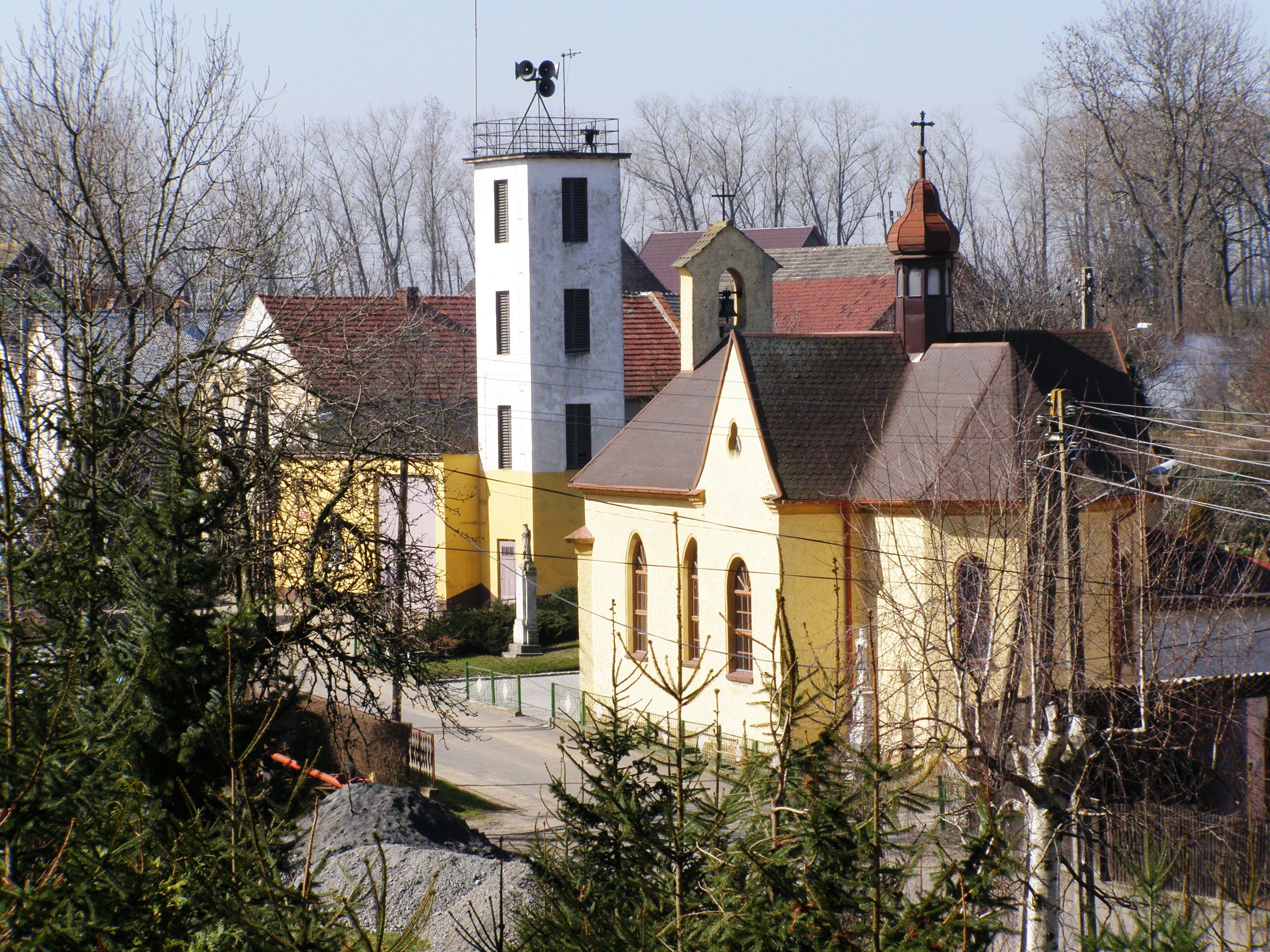
- Chapel and the fire station
- Interactive map of Prężynka
- Location within Poland
- Coordinates: 50°21′11″N 17°36′40″E
- Country: Poland
- Voivodeship: Opole
- County: Prudnik
- Gmina: Lubrza

Population
  - Total: 320
- Time zone: UTC+1 (CET)
  - Summer (DST): UTC+2 (CEST)
- Vehicle registration: OPR

Prężynka [prɛ̃ˈʐɨnka] (formerly Polish: Prężyna Mała, German: Klein Pramsen) is a village in the administrative district of Gmina Lubrza, within Prudnik County, Opole Voivodeship, in southern Poland, close to the Czech border.

== Notable residents ==
- Albert Battel (1891–1952), German Righteous Among the Nations

== See also ==
- Prudnik Land
