= Saviors in the Night =

- German: Unter Bauern - Retter in der Nacht
- Directed by: Ludi Boeken
- Starring: Veronica Ferres and Armin Rohde
- Release date: 1 October 2009 (Germany)
- Language: German

Saviors in the Night (Unter Bauern - Retter in der Nacht) is a German-French film directed by Ludi Boeken and starring Veronica Ferres and Armin Rohde. The film is based on a true story and first premiered at the Holocaust memorial in Jerusalem, Yad Vashem. It premiered at German cinemas on 8 October 2009. Ferres plays Marga Spiegel, a Jewish woman, persecuted by the Nazis who eventually survived with the help of farmers in Westphalia. The film is based on her memoirs, published in 1965 as the book Savior in the Night.

== Plot ==
Westphalia in 1943: The Jew Siegmund "Menne" Spiegel, a horse dealer, does not want to lead his wife Marga and daughter Karin to their deaths, so he and his small family flee from the threat of deportation to the extermination camps in the East to join their previous customers and war comrades from the First World War. He now asks them for help, and they agree: while the blonde Marga and her daughter are quartered on the Aschoff family's farm as a "bombed-out Dortmund resident" – even though Heinrich Aschoff has been a member of the Nazi Party since 1930. Menne may hide in the stables of the farmers. Two farming families protect the small family, while endangering their lives. Under false names, the Spiegels hide for the almost endless two years until the end of the war.

== Reviews ==
A moving historical drama about a Jewish family that is hidden from the Nazis by farmers out of Christian charity. The heroic individual case illustrates the moral failure of millions."

— BR online

An important film against forgetting, which reminds without false pathos that one can follow one's conscience even in difficult times.

— Cinema

== Filming locations ==
Filming took place from mid-August to early October 2008, over 38 days in Dülmen, Billerbeck, Liesborn (Auf der Drift), Lippstadt, Oer-Erkenschwick, and other Westphalian locations, often using original props.

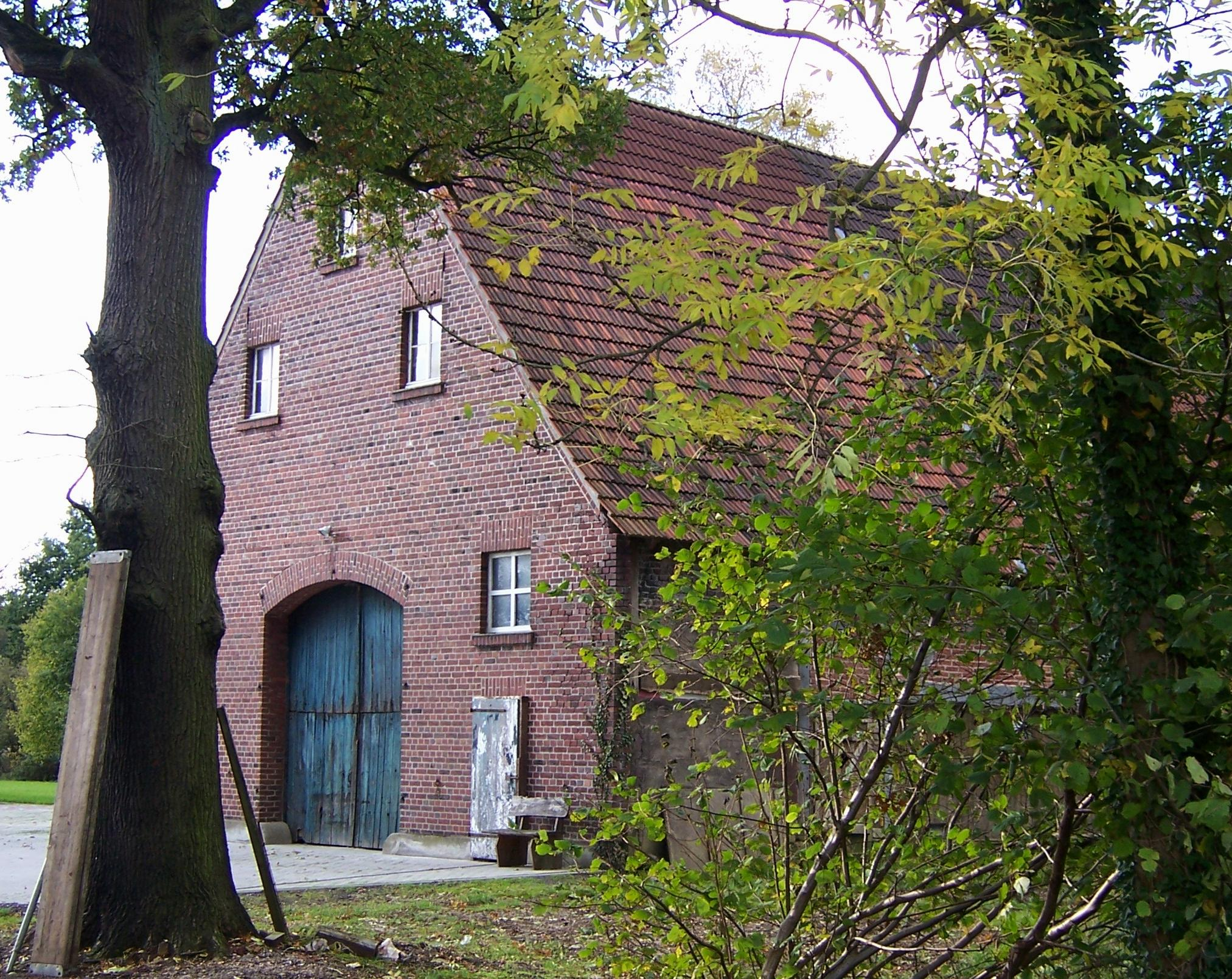
Picture from the location Dülmen

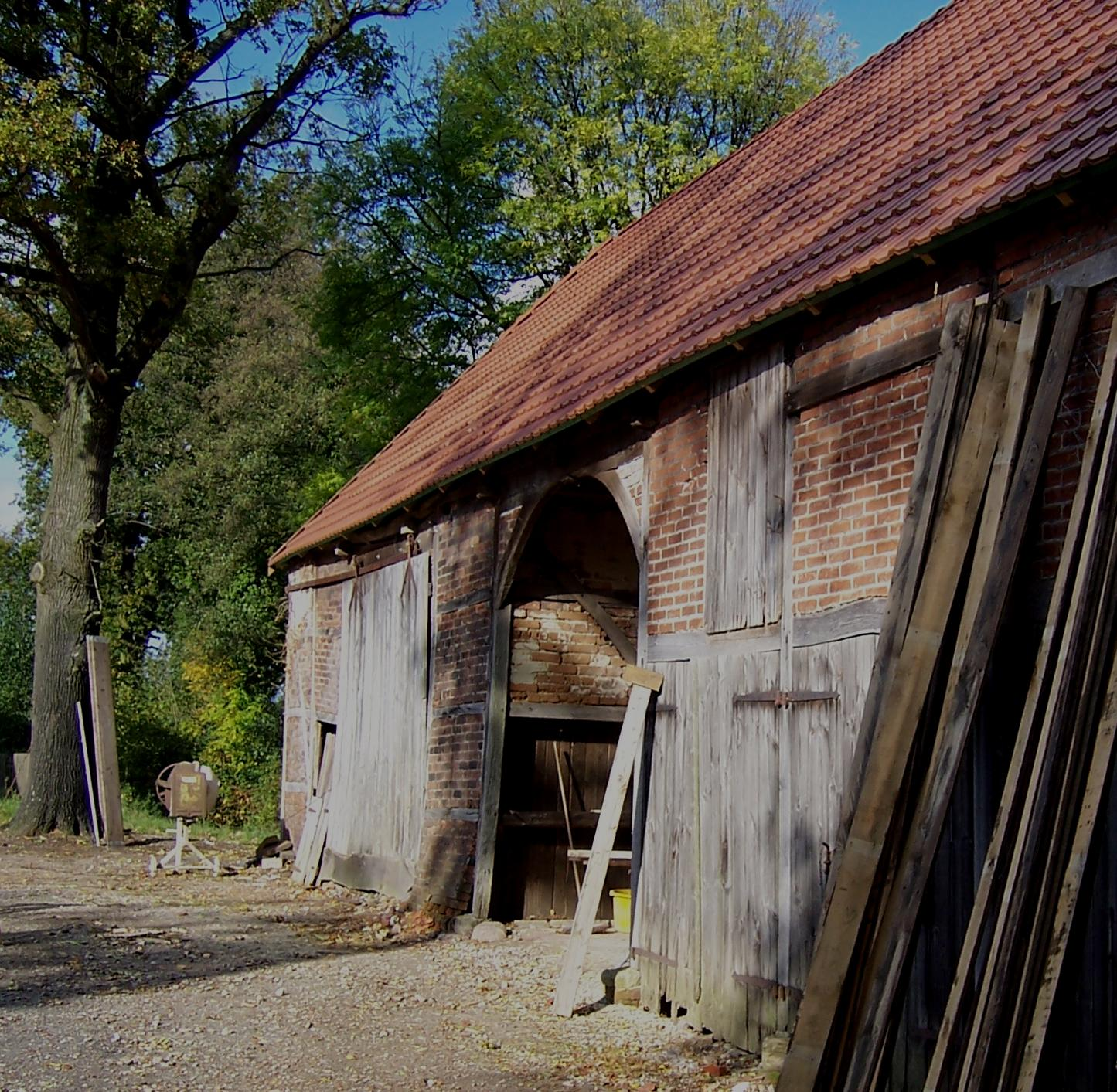
Image from the same location
