= Durchgangsstrasse IV =

Former Ukrainian highway

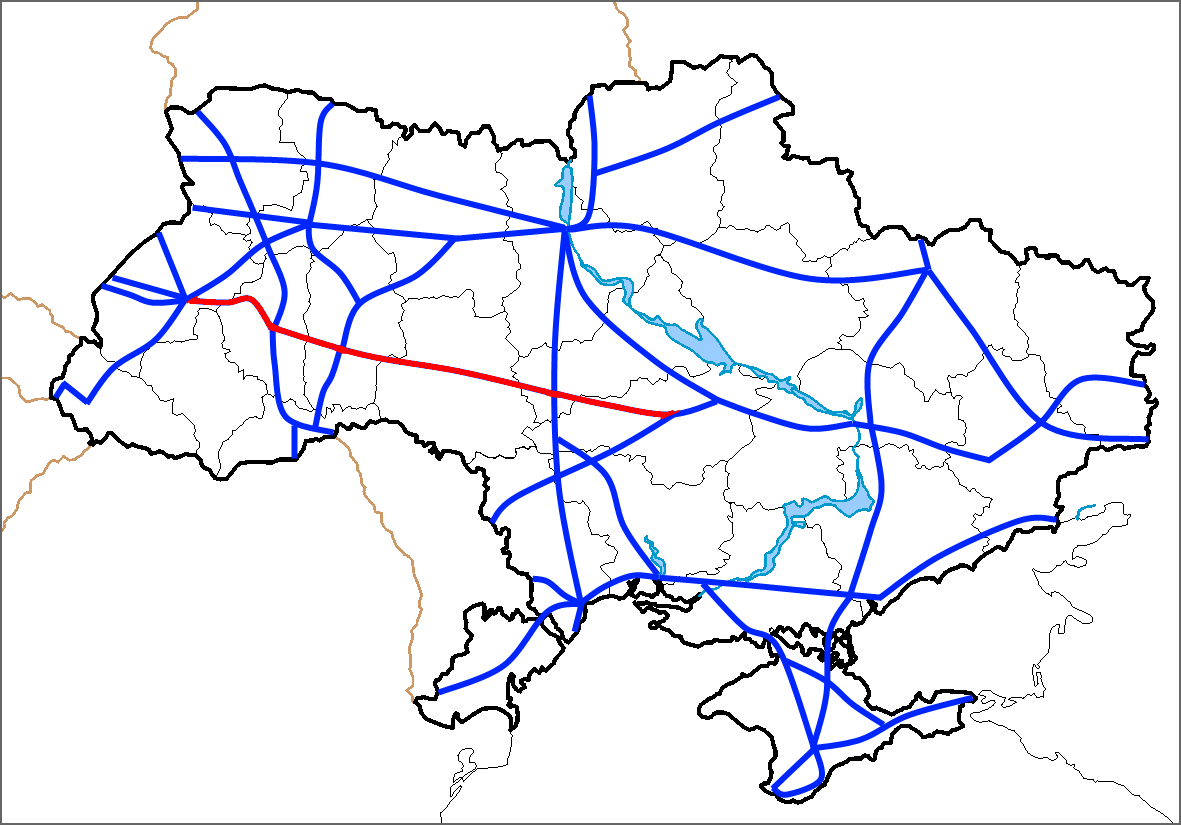
Map of modern Highway M12 that largely follows the path of Durchgangsstraße IV

Durchgangsstrasse IV (translated as Thoroughfare IV or Transit Road IV; abbreviated DG IV) was a road constructed by Nazi Germany in occupied Ukraine during World War II. It was a strategic military road to supply the southern sector of the Eastern Front. The large scale constructions works started in early 1942 to support the German advance towards Stalingrad. It ran for over 2,000 kilometres (1,200 mi) from Lviv east to Stalino (now Donetsk). Organisation Todt was responsible for the construction which was sub-contracted to several private construction firms. It was constructed by forced laborers – Soviet prisoners of war, local civilians, and Jews – who were procured by the SS and guarded by the Schutzmannschaft battalions. One of the largest forced labor projects undertaken by Nazi Germany that involved Jewish labor, it marked a transition between using Jews as forced laborers to the practice of "extermination through labour".

== Construction ==
In December 1941, Heinrich Himmler inspected the southern sector of the Eastern Front and experienced poor road conditions first hand. He even had to cancel a meeting with Eberhard von Mackensen, commander of the III Army Corps as road conditions made it too difficult to reach the unit. Himmler quickly agreed that road improvement was a top priority. The planning for the road started in fall 1941. It was not a new road but a widening (to 8 metres (26 ft)) and modernization of a late 18th-century Russian road built by Catherine the Great. The planned road stretched approximately 2,175 kilometres (1,351 mi) from Lviv in District of Galicia of the General Government via Ternopil, Letychiv, Vinnytsia, Haisyn, Uman, Kirovograd (now Kropyvnytskyi), Kryvyi Rih, Dnipropetrovsk (now Dnipro), Stalino (now Donetsk), and Taganrog to Rostov-on-Don in Russia. The road had two branches – DG IVb from Lviv via Brody, Dubno to Rivne and DG IVc from Kirovograd via Oleksandriia, Kremenchuk to Poltava. At Vinnytsia, the road would intersect with the proposed Durchgangsstrasse V that would connect to Werwolf, Führer Headquarters, and go south up to Zhytomyr. There were further plans to extend the road into Caucasus as the Wehrmacht advanced further into Russia. The initial plans called for the road further south, but the plans were modified to avoid Transnistria Governorate controlled by the Romanian allies. When the project was discussed with Adolf Hitler, he insisted that the road be primitive and the surface should last only two to three years. Other projects undertaken under the auspices of DG IV included the repair of the Dnieper Hydroelectric Station and building a bridge over the Kerch Strait and a bridge over the Southern Bug at Mykolaiv.

In District of Galicia, SS and Police Leader Fritz Katzmann ordered Jews to work on the road in October 1941 (some photos of DG IV were included in the Katzmann Report of June 1943). Historians have proposed that when Reinhard Heydrich made a reference to Jews working on road construction during the Wannsee Conference in January 1942, it was an allusion to the DG IV project. The large-scale construction works started in 1942 in preparation for the German advance towards Stalingrad. Organisation Todt was charged with constructing the road and provided technical supervisors while Legion Speer transported supplies. Various German construction companies were contracted to build different sections of the road. The SS was tasked with providing forced laborers and their guards. Himmler put Higher SS and Police Leader Hans-Adolf Prützmann in charge of the SS units involved in the construction. Prützmann organized a special task force (Einsatzstab) commanded by Oberstleutnant Walter Gieseke. He commanded four Oberbauabschnittsleitungen (Senior Construction Sector Directorates) based in Vinnytsia, Kirovograd, Kryvyi Rih, and Stalino. In total, about 5,000 Germans worked on the road. A network of small camps for forced laborers was set up about every 15 kilometres (9.3 mi). About 50 camps for Jews have been documented. These camps were guarded by various auxiliary police battalions of Ukrainian, Lithuanian, Latvian, and Cossack Schutzmannschaft. The main tasks of forced laborers was to produce, collect, and transport materials (e.g. sand, gravel), construct the road, and build protections (e.g. walls against snowdrifts or ditches for drainage).

The road was also an anchor for various support facilities – field hospitals, veterinary clinics, motor pools, repair shops, supply depots, etc. In July 1943, a directive from Erich von dem Bach-Zelewski transferred the protection of all thoroughfares from the SS to the Wehrmacht. As Red Army began its advance in late summer and fall 1943, sections of the road came under fire and were captured by the Soviets. The last labor camps were liquidated in December 1943. The Operations Staff on DG IV was disbanded in January–February 1944.

== Forced laborers ==
Even though private construction companies contracted to build DG IV paid SS for the forced laborers and their rations, the conditions were very poor and rations were meager. Germans used Soviet POWs to construct the road. The POWs were taken from POW camps and placed into a network of transit camps (Durchgangslager) along the road. The conditions were poor resulting in high rate of deaths. A March 1942 report from one of the camps stated that out of 1,052 POWs taken for works, 183 had already died and 174 had fallen ill. POWs provided insufficient labor force and Germans forced civilians living within 50 kilometres (31 mi) on either side of the road to work on DG IV. Conditions of the civilians were better as they were paid for their work and could return home after the workday. However, civilians were also needed to work in agriculture. To protect the labor force, civilians living within the 50 km zone were not to be taken for forced labor to Nazi Germany. The Germans also used Jews to construct DG IV, but there were few located in the vicinity of the road who had survived the mass executions in 1941. Therefore, Germans looked for Jews in the Transnistria Governorate where Jews deported from Bukovina and Bessarabia were housed in various camps. In August–November 1942 and May 1943, groups of Jews were taken from various camps, including the Pechora concentration camp, in Transnistria to work on DG IV. The food ration were very poor and many Jews died from starvation and exhaustion. Jews unfit for labor were shot. Jewish camps were also liquidated due to impending epidemics or once the assigned section of the road was completed. For example, a camp with about 1,250 Romanian Jews in Lityn was liquidated in September 1942. Despite facing manpower shortages, various German units pursued the Final Solution.

According to post-war investigations by the district attorney in Lübeck, approximately 50,000 POWs, 50,000 civilian workers, and 10,000 Jews worked on DG IV in 1942. The number of laborers decreased to 70,000 in 1943. This estimate is significantly lower than numbers provided by Hans-Adolf Prützmann in a June 1943 letter to Himmler. Prützmann stated that more than 140,000 laborers were working on the road and were guarded by about 12,000 men from Schutzmannschaft. In a June 1943 report, Fritz Katzmann stated that about 20,000 Jews "passed through" the camps built for DG IV and that 160 kilometres (99 mi) of road was completed in District of Galicia. German historian Hermann Kaienburg estimated that some 25,000 Jews were killed in labor camps related to DG IV in 84 known mass shootings when the labor camps were liquidated in late 1943 and early 1944. Willi Ahrem, commander of labor camp that was used to expand Durchgangsstrasse IV, helped Jews escape execution, for which he received the title of Righteous Among the Nations in 1965.

== Post-war investigations ==
Arnold Daghani, a Jewish artist, managed to escape from one of the camps in Mykhailivka near Haysin. In 1960, his diary was translated and published in West Germany. The publication spurred the Central Office of the State Justice Administrations for the Investigation of National Socialist Crimes to investigate SS officer Walter Gieseke. He was questioned in 1960 and later in 1968, after his subordinates provided additional information. Both times, Gieseke denied responsibility and shifted the blame to his superior, Hans-Adolf Prützmann. No charges were brought against Gieseke due to insufficient evidence. In 2006, a 11-minute film was found in a Baptist church in Cullompton, Devon. It shows high-ranking Nazis off-duty and one man inspecting a camp and receiving a column of slave laborers. Harry Bennett, associate professor at Plymouth University, identified the man as Gieseke which could prove his role in the atrocities along DG IV.

In 1966, after a decade-long investigation involving 1,500 interviews, two cases related to atrocities committed at Ternopil were brought before court. Ten men were tried in the first case; two (Paul Raebel and Hermann Müller) received life sentences and five others received prison sentences. The second case involved 15 men; Ernst Epple received a life sentence while other nine men received prison sentences ranging from 2.5 to 5 years. Other cases were brought in Lübeck against Franz Christoffel and Oskar Friese in 1965, in Bremen against Otto Fach in 1970, and in Dortmund in 1971. All these proceedings resulted in acquittals due to lack of evidence. Investigation into Walter Mintel, commandant of the Mykhailivka camp, was dropped in 1976. Jürgen Stroop, who was inspector of DG IV, was executed in 1952 for his role in the liquidation of the Warsaw Ghetto.
