= Hedwig Porschütz =

German opponent to Nazism

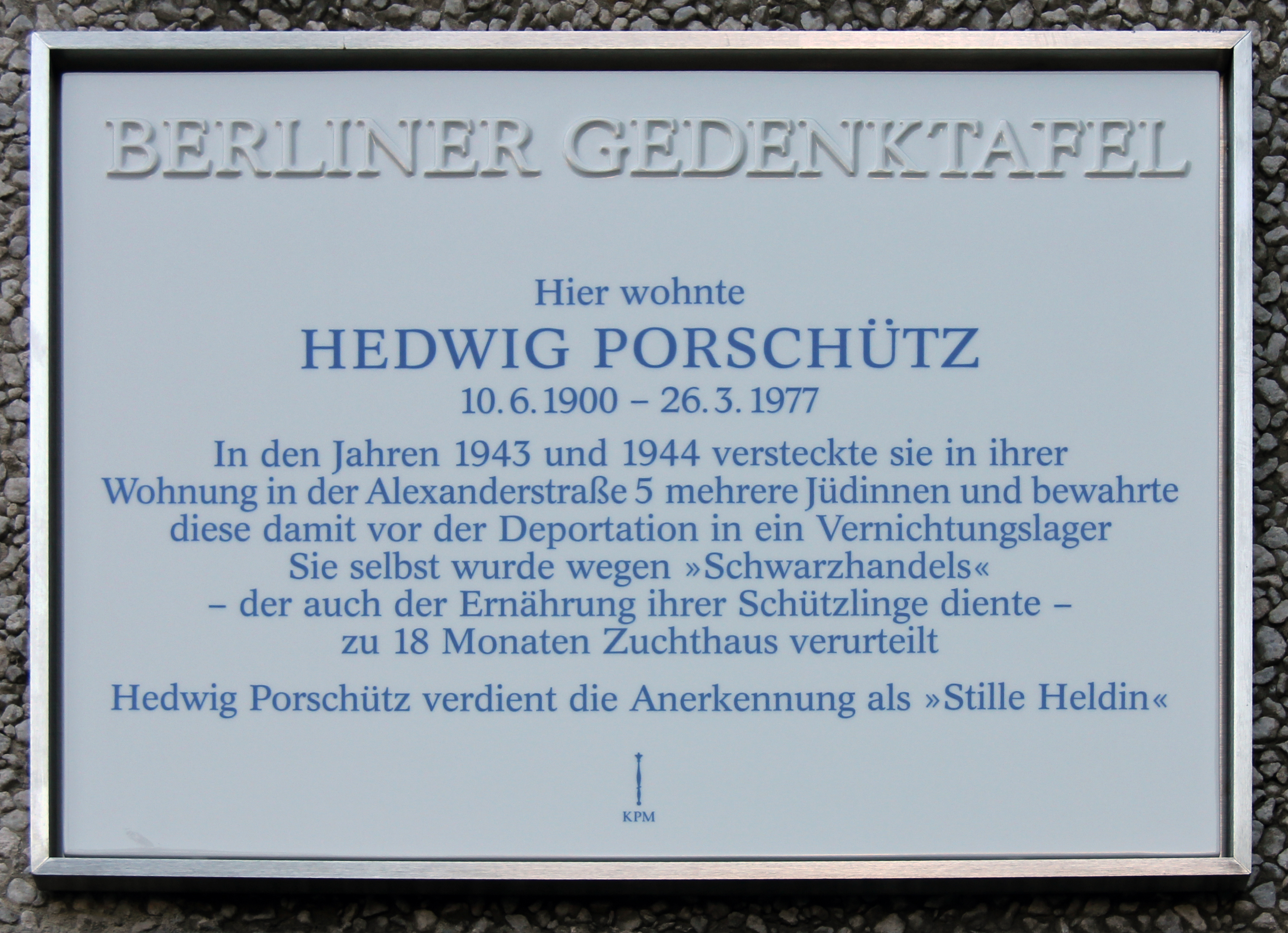
- Berlin memorial plaque
- Born: Hedwig Völker; 10 June 1900; Berlin-Schöneberg, German Empire
- Died: 26 March 1977 (aged 76); West Berlin, West Germany
- Awards: Righteous Among the Nations

Hedwig Porschütz (German: [ˈheːtvɪç ˈpɔʁʃʏts]; née Völker; 10 June 1900 – 26 March 1977) was active in the German resistance to Nazism. She was recognised posthumously as Righteous Among the Nations for aiding and rescuing Jews during the Holocaust.

== Life ==
Hedwig Völker was born in 1900 in Berlin-Schöneberg. In 1926 she married Walter Porschütz, who was then a chauffeur and would later be conscripted into the Wehrmacht. During the Great Depression she became a prostitute, and in 1934 she was accused of blackmail and sentenced to ten months in prison.

=== World War II ===
From 1940, Porschütz worked in Otto Weidt's workshop for the blind as a stockroom worker and later stenotypist. They were in close contact, and she significantly assisted Weidt's effort to protect his employees by hiding Jewish women in her home and illegally trading for supplies.

The twins Marianne and Anneliese Bernstein stayed in Porschütz' apartment for six months starting from January 1943. In March they were joined by Grete Seelig and Lucie Ballhorn. Occasionally prostitutes would use the apartment – then the occupants would have to wait outside until the clients were gone. When the situation ultimately became too dangerous, due to police raiding another apartment in the same building in mid-1943, the Bernstein twins relocated to Wilmersdorf while Porschütz' mother sheltered the other two women. Three of the four would survive the Holocaust.

Goods Porschütz bought on the black market would be given to persecuted Jews and used to bribe Gestapo officers. Otto Weidt's group sent more than 150 food parcels to Theresienstadt Ghetto to supply at least 25 people imprisoned there. Porschütz also procured forged documents for Inge Deutschkron. Due to her black market trade, Porschütz was sentenced to 18 months in prison in October 1944 by a Nazi Sondergericht. For a time she was imprisoned in Zillerthal-Erdmannsdorf, a subcamp of Gross-Rosen concentration camp.

=== Later life ===
After the war, her activities went unrecognised for many years. Her requests to be compensated for political persecution and to be titled an "Unsung Heroine" were rejected by West Berlin authorities in 1959. Authorities at the time did not consider helping Jews an act of resistance. Due to her prior work as a prostitute Porschütz was regarded as an immoral and dishonourable person. The 1944 judgment, despite having been delivered by a political court, was used against her. She died poor in 1977; no known photos of her exist.

== Legacy ==
It took until November 2010 for Porschütz to be honoured by the city of Berlin with a memorial plaque, which was later placed at her former address (Feurigstraße 43). By 2011 the 1944 judgement was repealed on the basis that the Nazi court made political judgements to execute the "Führer's will". Yad Vashem recognised her as Righteous Among the Nations in 2012, a commemoration ceremony was held three years later. A street in Berlin-Mitte was named in her honour in 2018 (Hedwig-Porschütz-Straße).
