= Marga Spiegel =

German writer

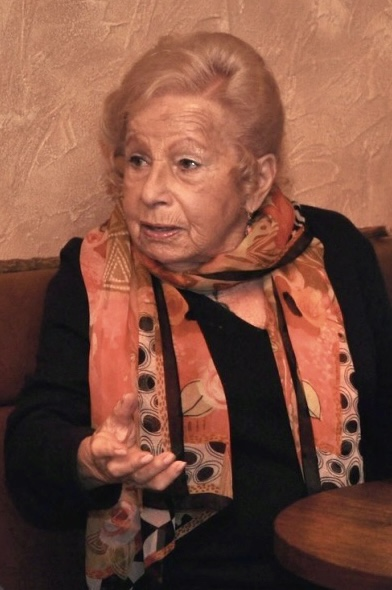
- Marga Spiegel in November 2009
- Born: Margarette Rothschild; 21 June 1912; Oberaula, Hesse, Germany
- Died: 11 March 2014 (aged 101); Münster, North Rhine-Westphalia, Germany
- Other names: Marga Krone, while in hiding
- Occupation: Author
- Known for: Surviving the Holocaust and writing a memoir, which also became a film
- Notable work: Saviors in the Night (Unter Bauern – Retter in der Nacht)
- Spouse: Siegmund "Menne" Spiegel
- Children: 2
- Relatives: Paul Spiegel, president of the Central Council of Jews in Germany (nephew)
- Awards: Federal Cross of Merit; Honorary Award of the Cinema for Peace Foundation; Order of Merit of North Rhine-Westphalia

Marga Spiegel (21 June 1912 – 11 March 2014) was a German woman who went into hiding with her daughter in 1943 during the Holocaust of World War II. Her husband also hid during the war, but separately from the family since it was harder to conceal a Jewish man of military age. He was also well known in the farming community as a cattle and horse trader. Even though they had some close calls, Spiegel and her family survived for several years with the help of several farmers and their families.

Spiegel's family was persecuted by the Nazis beginning in 1933 when Adolf Hitler became chancellor, and the Nazi Party changed Germany's form of government to a dictatorship. Nazis enacted laws to classify undesirable people as "enemies of the state" or outcasts. The Rothschilds were subject to arrests and harassment. Siegmund Rothschild was sent to a concentration camp early in the Holocaust and died there in 1938, one year after the death of his wife. Marga Spiegel's husband, Siegmund Spiegel, lost 37 members of his family during this period.

After being forced to leave their home and business in Ahlen, the Spiegels lived in an apartment for Jews with six other families. Then, Germans assigned Siegmund to a forced labor work unit, and he lived with his family in a run-down, former Army barracks back in Ahlen. They decided to hide after the Spiegels were ordered to meet with the Gestapo on 27 February 1943.

Spiegel wrote a book about their story. It was published in 1969 and was later released as a movie in 2009 titled Saviors in the Night. Between 2010 and 2014, she received the Federal Cross of Merit, Honorary Award of the Cinema for Peace Foundation, and the Order of Merit of North Rhine-Westphalia.

== Early life ==
Margarette (Marga) Rothschild was born in Oberaula, Hesse, Germany, on 21 June 1912. Her parents, Cilly (Rosenstock) and Siegmund Rothschild, raised her in Oberaula, which had been the hometown of their ancestors for 300 years. Her parents operated a retail store and a shop that made blueprint dye. She had a younger sister, Inge Johanna.

The year 1933 brought monumental changes in Marga's life. She graduated from high school the same year that Adolf Hitler, a dictator, became the chancellor, and the Nazi Party came into power and initiated antisemitic laws. Siegmund Rothschild was able to pull a few strings to get Marga into a school in Marburg that did not allow Jews. His leverage was that he had fought during World War I. She studied mathematics and physics for a year or so, but she left the school after classmates harassed her for being a Jew.

Spiegel was the aunt of Paul Spiegel, who became the president of the Central Council of Jews in Germany.

== Holocaust era (1933–1945) ==
=== Nazi Party from 1933 to 1938 ===
Adolf Hitler restructured the government of Germany beginning on 30 January 1933 when he was appointed chancellor of Germany. Hitler and other Nazis changed the form of government to a dictatorship from its former republic. Legislation was enacted that classified people by whether or not they were beneficial or harmful to the country. If they were undesirable, such as if they were Jewish, they were classified as "enemies of the state" or "outcasts". Following Hitler's lead, the mayor of their town persecuted Jews, like Siegmund Rothschild and his family. They were subject to arrest on "flimsy" charges, taunted, and attacked. The family considered fleeing Germany, but Cilly was in very poor health due to a chronic heart condition. Siegmund Rothschild was convicted of usury and fraud and sentenced to prison. Marga was apprehended several times. After her daughter was born, bystanders threw stones at the stroller when Spiegel took her daughter for walks.

Marga Rothschild married Siegmund (Menne) Spiegel, becoming Marga Spiegel, in January 1937. Her husband served during World War I and received the Iron Cross for courage on the battlefield. Siegmund was a successful horse and cattle trader in northern Germany. The Spiegels developed good relationships with Siegmund's customers who lived near Ahlen in Münsterland.

Spiegel's mother, Cilly, died on 18 March 1937, about the time of Marga and Siegmund's marriage. Her father and sister moved in with the Spiegels after Cilly's death. Siegmund Rothschild was arrested on 14 June 1938 at his daughter's home. As Nazi Germany began rounding up and deporting Jews en masse to extermination camps, her father was taken to Sachsenhausen concentration camp and died there on 12 July 1938, about one month after his arrest. (Note: In November 2007, bronze plaques were erected in their memory at the Rothschilds' house in Oberaula. The plaques are called "stumble stones" (Stolpersteine).)

The Spiegels lived initially in Ahlen, where their daughter Karin was born in 1938. After the war, they had a son.

While Spiegel wanted to immigrate to Palestine, Siegmund believed that he would be excluded from persecution. His feelings changed after Kristallnacht (The Night of Broken Glass, 9 to 10 November 1938) when men from the Nazi Sturmabteilung (SA) organization entered the Spiegel's residence in Ahlen and used clubs to beat Siegmund, Spiegel, and her sister Inge Johanna (Johanna) Rothschild. The SA men also raided their home. Johanna married Leo Spiegel within a few years. (Note: One set of records states that Leo was arrested and was taken to Sachsenhausen on 21 December 1938. Johanna was deported from Düsseldorf. Both Leo and Johanna arrived at the Łódź Ghetto on 27 October 1941. They left the ghetto for the Chełmno extermination camp, arriving there on 12 July 1944. They both died the following day. Yet, the Central Database of Shoah Victims' Names at Yad Vashem record for Leo states that he died at Auschwitz concentration camp. No date of death was provided. Johanna was also said to have died there.)

=== World War II (1939–1945) ===
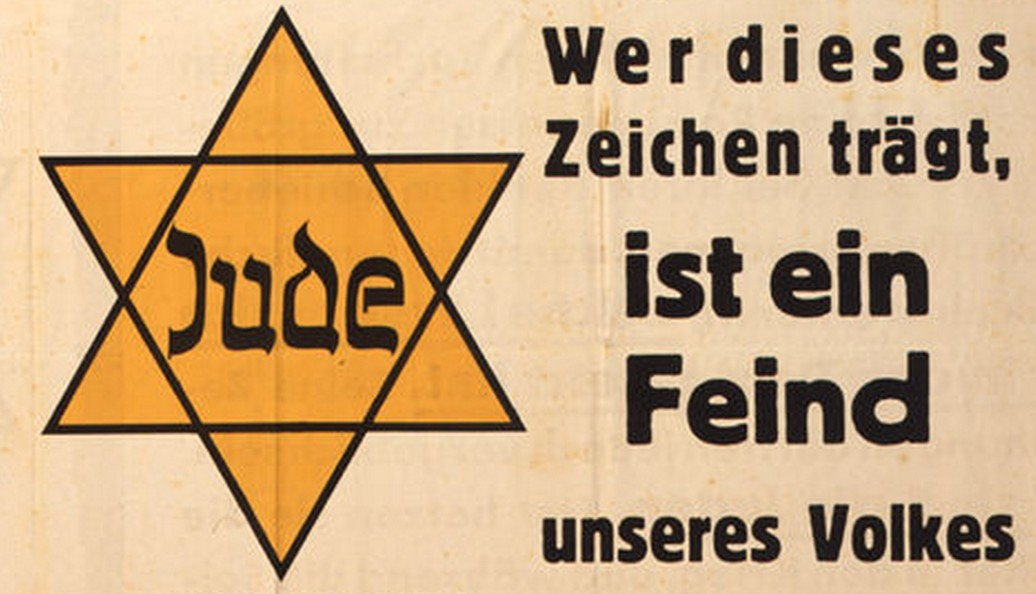
"Whoever wears this sign is an enemy of our people" – Parole der Woche, July 1, 1942

Around the time Siegmund decided to leave Germany, World War II had begun (1 September 1939), and they were no longer able to leave the country. Spiegel and her husband were required to wear badges in the shape of yellow stars on their clothes to identify themselves as Jews. Since 1939, their identification cards also classified them as Jewish.

The Nazi government forced the Spiegels and any other remaining Jews to leave Ahlen in November 1942. They moved into a building for Jews in Dortmund, sharing an apartment with six other families. When the Nazi regime assigned Siegmund to forced labor, he worked in a colliery-related business. The family and the rest of Siegmund's work unit moved into former Army barracks in Ahlen. By February 1943, there were few Jews left in Dortmund.

My husband had to perform forced labor. Jews could be deployed only in columns of about 17 men and had non-Jewish supervisors. For many of our acquaintances, the concentration camp existence began at that time. They had supervisors who ordered them around like slaves and harassed them when in the mood.

— Marga Spiegel

The Spiegels began to hear rumors that German Jews were sent east to Poland by the Nazi government. They heard that after Jews dug their own graves, they were shot by Germans at the prepared sites. To avoid his family from being taken by the Nazis, Siegmund reached out to cattle farmers in the Lüdinghausen area that he knew to help develop a plan to hide. Since the rations allotted to Jews were insufficient, he also sought ways to get more food. He found that the farmers offered shelter when they needed it, and until then, they dropped off food periodically for the Spiegels. Siegmund also rented a bike from one of the farmers he knew and drove in a circuit to friend's farms to pick up extra food that the farmers provided.

The Germans exterminated 37 people from Siegmund's family. Most of their Jewish neighbors had been deported from Dortmund as the Speiegels tried to plan their next steps. They received a summons to report to a meeting with the Gestapo at a slaughterhouse on 27 February 1943, with the pretext of ensuring that their working papers were in order. On the day that they were supposed to report to the Gestapo, the Spiegels removed their yellow patches from their clothes and headed for the railroad station.

Realizing that they would be less likely to be caught if they split up, they planned for Spiegel to take their daughter, and Siegmund would hide on his own. Marga had blonde hair like stereotypical Aryans, so the mother and daughter would more easily blend in with other Germans. Mother and daughter assumed new names and headed for the town of Herbern to stay with Heinrich Aschoff. Spiegel told Karin that her father was a soldier and was going away to fight the war. It was harder to find a place of Siegmund to stay because he was the age of military soldiers and was also known for his job. Still he found a family to stay with in Dolberg (near Ahlen). That situation only lasted for three weeks due to their own family crises and because the children feared being found to have harbored a Jew. After he left the family in Dolberg, he went to Hubert Pentrop's farm. He was fortunately warned when SS personnel were in the area. Spiegel said that she believed the farmers and their families were motivated by their faith and sense of humanity, explicitly mentioning that they were driven by the commandment, "Love your neighbor as yourself".

==== Hubert Pentrop ====
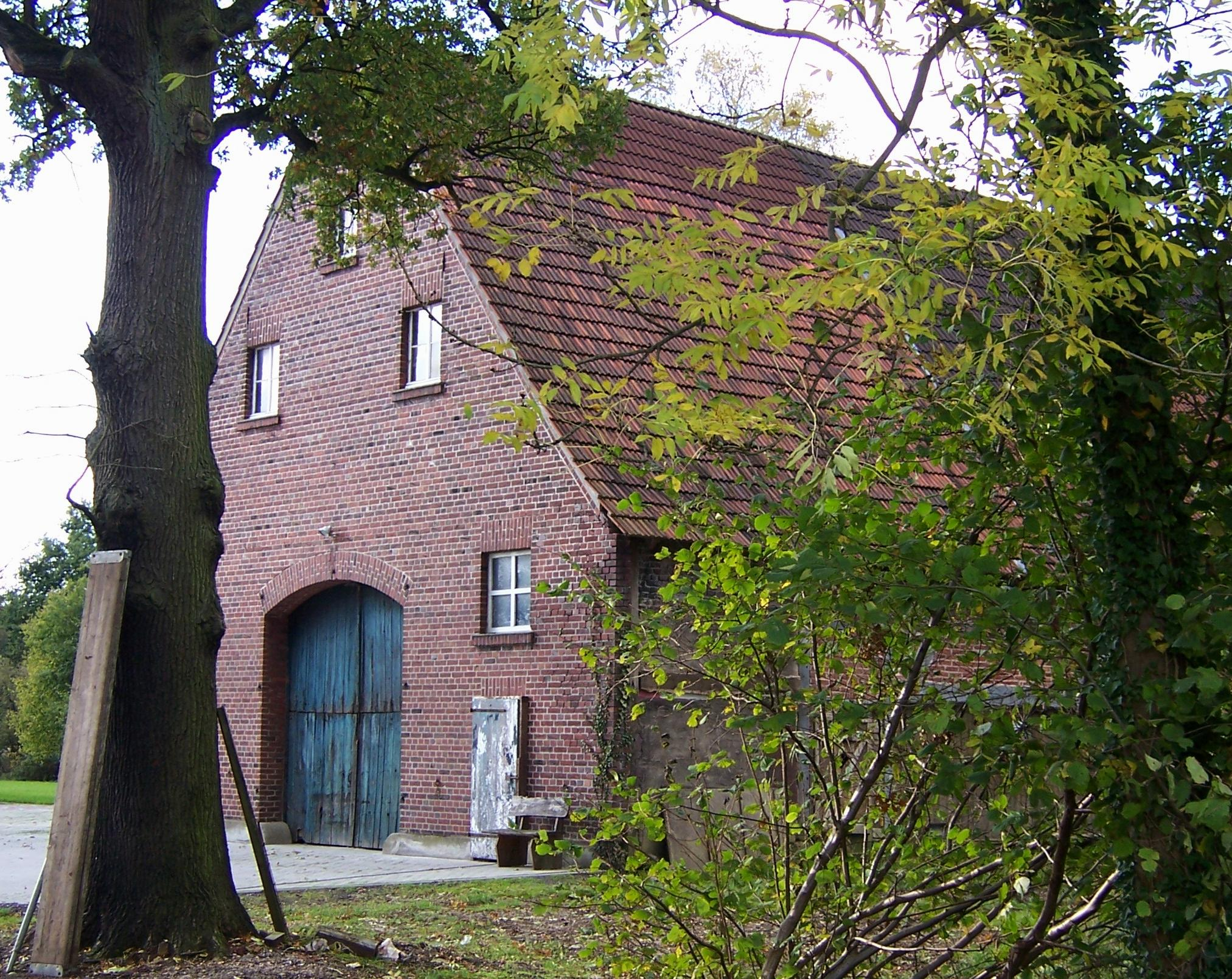
One of the farms in Westphalia used for the film made from her memoir Saviors in the Night

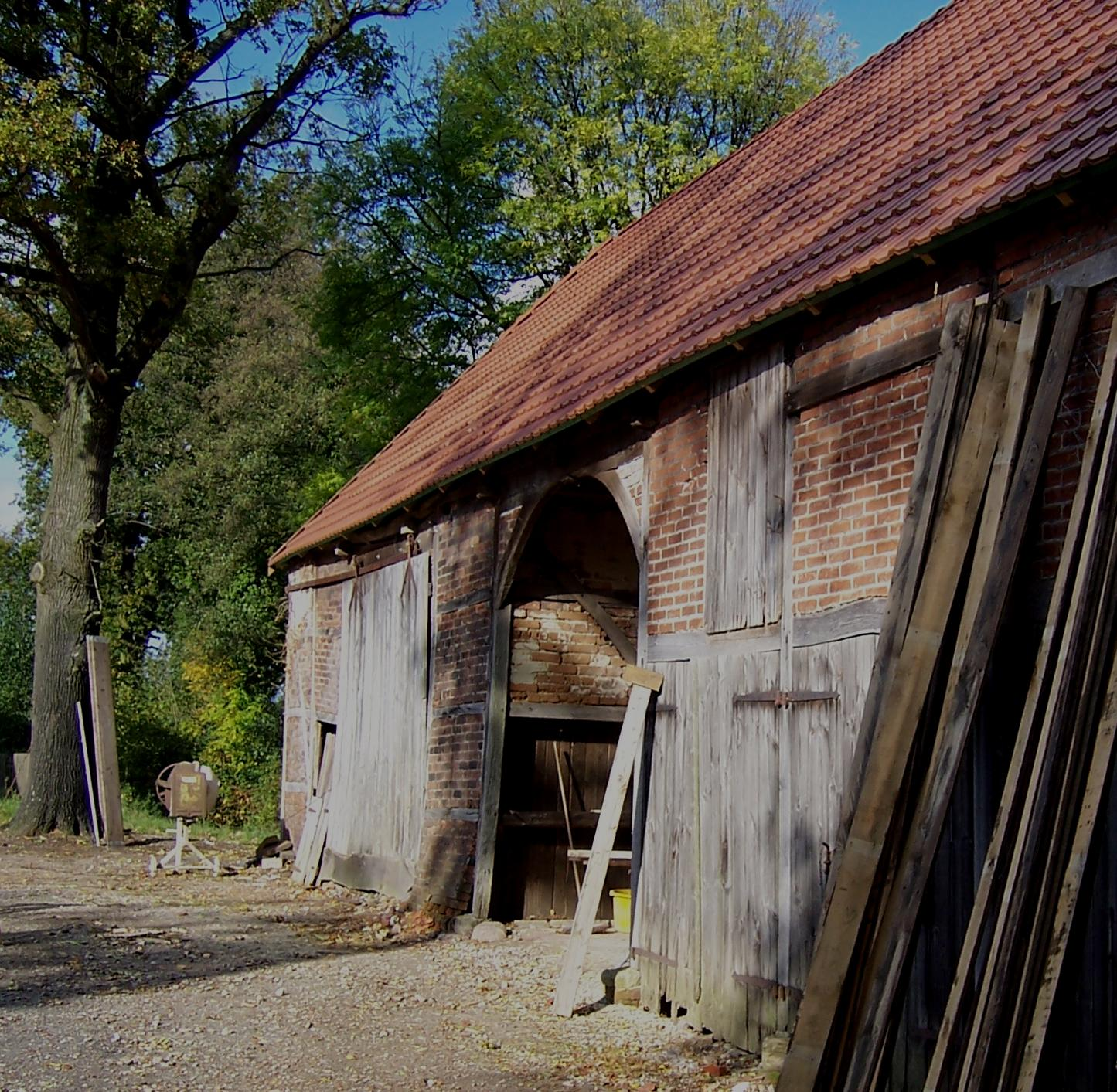
Another image from the same farm

Sigmund reached out to Hubert Pentrop of Nordkirchen for assistance when he began planning to hide. Pentrop warned him that he and his family should not go to Poland. He offered to help the Spiegels with food and shelter. When the arrangement with the family in Dolberg did not work out, Hubert Pentrop took him in. Heinrich's wife was pregnant and seriously ill. A young woman, Maria Südfeld, moved in with the Pentrops to help with his wife and their six children. She found out about Siegmund and promised not to tell anyone that he was at the Pentrop's house. Pentrop made up a specific knock sequence that should be the only one that Siegmund responded to. Siegmund alternated hiding in the cellar, attic, and hayloft. He stayed hidden throughout the day, and at night he could go for a short walk.

Siegmund was only able to get a glimpse of his daughter only once during their years in hiding. He put on Pentrop's uniform from World War I, wore his own Iron Cross medal, and Siegmund pretended that he was visiting on a holiday.

After about nine months, he was spotted by a Hitler Youth (Hitlerjugend). The boy had heard the secret knock, and used it himself on another visit. Siegmund opened the door and was seen. Siegmund moved out and lived briefly with a family who became very afraid of having him in their house. He then went to Heinrich Silkenbömer's farm. Pentrop received the title Righteous Among the Nations on 20 July 1969. After the war, he was recognized for supplying essential goods, rescuing and hiding Jews, and arranging shelter.

==== Heinrich Aschoff ====
A farmer, Heinrich Aschoff, took in Spiegel and her daughter Karin. Heinrich and his wife had eight children, one of who was a soldier. The Aschoff told their two oldest daughters that Spiegel and her daughter were Jews. Anni, one of the older girls, was a member of the Bund Deutscher Mädel (BDM), the female Hitler Youth organization, also known as the League of German Girls. Mirjam picked them up from the train station. The story for the other children and people outside of the family was that the mother and daughter needed a safe place to stay outside the city where they would not be subject as much to air raids. They said that her husband, Mr. Krone, was fighting the war at the front. They were known as the "Bombed-Out Krone Family from Dortmund".

The Aschoffs, prone to sheltering other refugees and having a lot of visitors, entertained a policeman one day who put Karin on his lap. When he asked her name, the little girl, fortunately, answered Karin Krone. While at the Aschoff's farm in Herbern Lüdinghausen, Spiegel performed household chores. She and her daughter moved to other family's homes periodically to reduce the risk of being caught. In one case, Spiegel moved out after one of the yellow badges fell out of its hiding place in her glove seemingly unnoticed. After the war, Aschoff received the title Righteous Among the Nations on 20 July 1969. He was recognized for supplying essential goods and shelter. The Spiegels and Aschoffs remained friends for life.

==== Bernhard Sickmann ====
The Spiegels knew the Sickmanns, who had been customers. They brought food to them once the Spiegel's food was rationed by the Nazis. Spiegel and her daughter sometimes stayed in Werne, Lüdinghausen with the Sickmann family, but the house was small and they had workers from other countries staying with them. They were always a source of food when the Spiegels needed it. When she was there, Spiegel attended church with Johanna Sickmann. Spiegel came to know Father Venantius, who offered to take in Spiegel and her daughter at the monastery if they needed shelter. Venantius counseled to the Catholic families who rescued her. In May 1944, someone alerted the police that Spiegel and her daughter were at the Pentrop's house. She escaped and went to the Sickmann's house, where mother and daughter stayed throughout the end of the war. Allied forces bombed Münster heavily in the fall of 1944, and Marga requested false identification from the Münster police office. She claimed that her paperwork was destroyed during the bombing. After the war, Sickmann received the title Righteous Among the Nations on 20 July 1969 for sheltering and providing goods for Spiegel and Karin. The Sickmann's granddaughter, Leoni Sickmann, attended the school in Werne that was named after Marga Spiegel and was at the ceremony that Spiegel attended when the school was opened.

==== Bernhard Südfeld ====
Spiegel and her daughter sometimes stayed at a farm in Südkirchen, Lüdinghausen, with the Südfeld family. They previously met Bernard's daughter Maria Südfeld at the Pentrop's house, where she was a housekeeper. After the war, Südfeld received the title Righteous Among the Nations on 20 July 1969 for sheltering and providing goods for Spiegel and Karin.

==== Heinrich Silkenbömer ====
After about nine months in hiding, the Silkenbömer family at Lüdinghausen took in Siegmund. Heinrich and his wife had two sons who were away fighting in the war. Siegmund stayed in the bedroom of one of the sons. He was treated well, and Marga was able to visit him occasionally at their farm. He lived there until the end of the war. After the war, Silkenbömer received the title Righteous Among the Nations on 20 July 1969, for sheltering and providing goods for Siegmund.

== After the war ==
The Spiegels were liberated when the American Army invaded the area on 30 April 1945. Spiegel was interested in leaving Germany after the war, but her husband insisted that they stay there. They returned to Ahlen, which was his ancestors' homeland. Siegmund felt greater confidence that he could return to being a cattle trader and farmer in Germany than he might be able to do elsewhere. They had a son. The children did not like living in the country that was so detrimental to their family. Their son immigrated to Spain, and Karin moved to the United States. Spiegel moved to Münster after her husband died. She visited school classrooms to tell of her experiences during the Holocaust.

For 21 years after the end of the war, the Spiegels received threatening calls; one set of phone calls resulted in the dismissal of a guilty policeman. Due to the continuing threats, the police had their house in Ahlen watched to ensure that they came to no harm. Siegmund had screaming nightmares into his eighties about being in his hiding places during World War II.

Spiegel wrote her book, Saviors in the Night in 1960 that told about how German citizens saved her from the concentration camps. The story of the "courageous farmers" was made into a film of the same name.

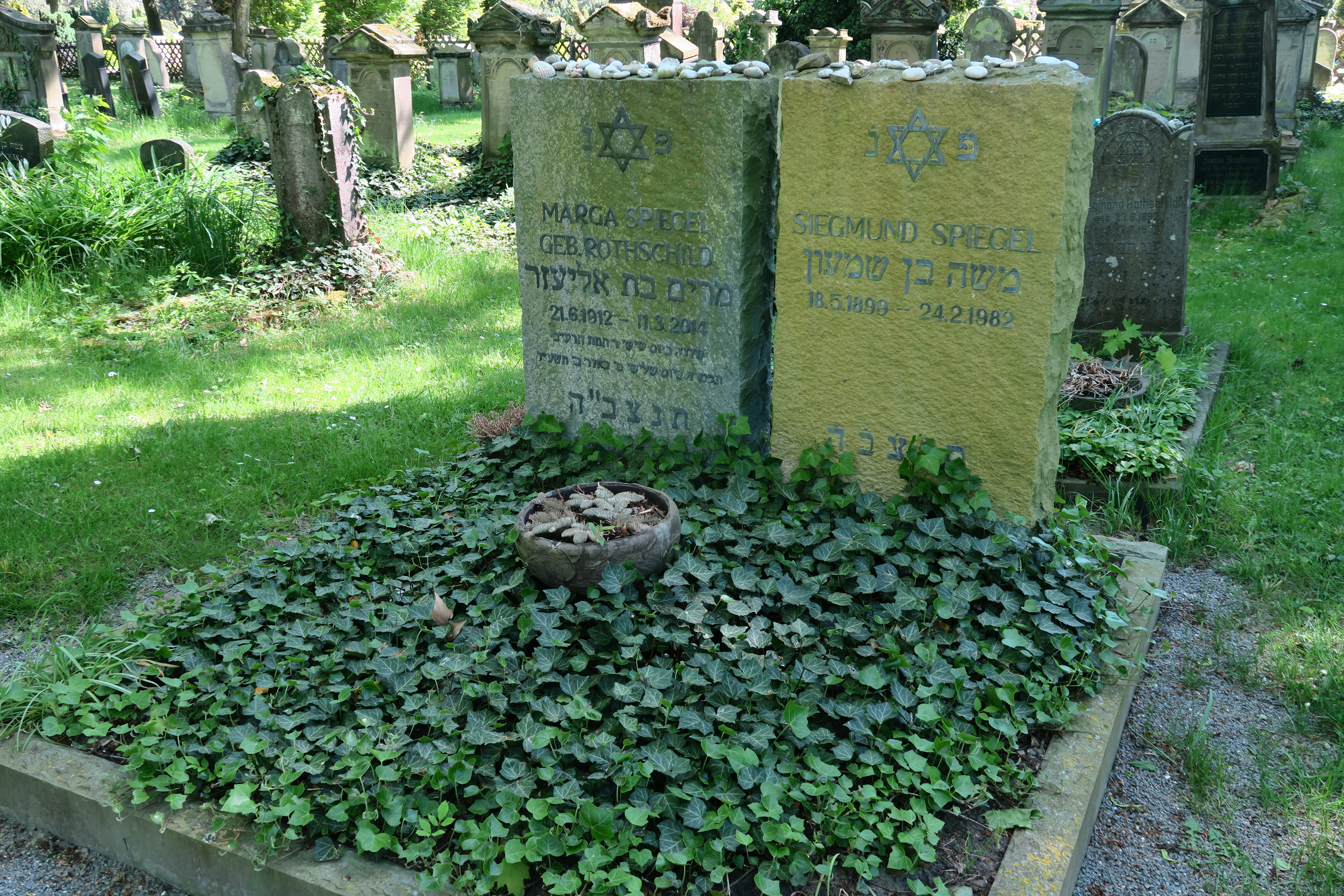
Jewish Cemetery in Ahlen, Tomb of Marga and Siegmund Spiegel. Photograph: NordNordWest, Lizenz: Creative Commons by-sa-3.0 de

Spiegel died from natural causes on 11 March 2014 in Münster, North Rhine-Westphalia, Germany. She was 101 years old. She was buried at the Jewish cemetery in Ahlen.

== Published works ==
- Marga Spiegel: Rescuers in the night. How a Jewish family survived in a Münsterland hideout. 7th edition. Lit Verlag, 2009, ISBN 978-3-8258-3595-8 (The 1st edition was published in 1969. Reprint as a series of articles in 1961/1962 in the magazine "Der Sämann" (organ of the Catholic rural people's movement).)
- Marga Spiegel: Farmers as saviors. How a Jewish family survived. With a foreword by Veronica Ferres. 2nd Edition. Lit Verlag, 2009, ISBN 978-3-8258-0942-3

== Legacy ==
- A school in Werne, where she lived with the Aschoffs, was named after Spiegel. The granddaughter of the Sickmanns who took Spiegel in, Leonie Sickmann, attended the ceremony and would be a student at the school.
- She received the Federal Cross of Merit in 2010.
- In 2013, she received the Honorary Award of the Cinema for Peace Foundation.
- In 2014, Spiegel was awarded the Order of Merit of North Rhine-Westphalia in Düsseldorf.

== Bibliography ==
- Keim, Anton Maria (1983). Yad Vashem : die Judenretter aus Deutschland. Mainz : Grünewald. ISBN 978-3-7867-1085-1.
- Paldiel, Mordecai (1993). The Path of the Righteous. Ktav. ISBN 978-0-88125-376-4.
