= Herbert Herden =

German police officer

Herbert Herden (German: [ˈhɛʁ.bɛʁt ˈheːɐ̯.dn̩]; 8 January 1915 – 11 February 2009) was a German police officer who was declared a Righteous Among the Nations on 17 March 2004. In occupied Poland he had been assigned to the apartment of Felicia Lieber's family and later aided them. He forged papers for them and ultimately became engaged to Felicia. He would go on to negotiate the release of her brother Ignacy (Yitzhak) Lieber, but Felicia was ultimately denounced and sent to Auschwitz concentration camp. Herden himself was sent to Dachau concentration camp in July 1944. After the war Herbert and Ignacy looked for missing people, including Felicia, but Felicia was never found. Ignacy, now Yitzhak, Lieber would be instrumental in informing Yad Vashem of Herden. In addition to the Leiber family Herden had used what resources he had to give food and aid to other Jews.
