= Max Liedtke =

German military officer (1894–1955)

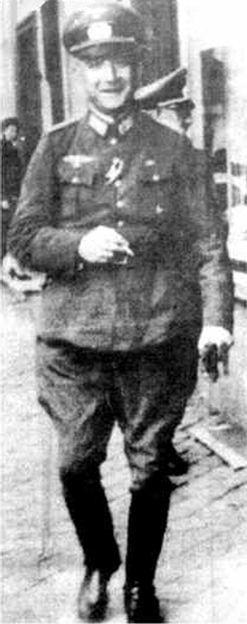
Liedtke in 1942

Max Liedtke (German: [maks ˈliːtkə]; 25 December 1894 – 13 January 1955) was a German journalist and army officer. He was honoured as Righteous Among the Nations for his resistance against the "liquidation" of the entire Jewish population (including slave labor) of the ghetto in Przemyśl in eastern Poland.

Liedtke was born in Preussisch Holland, East Prussia (today Pasłęk, Poland) to a Lutheran Vicar. He passed his Abitur in Gumbinnen (today Gusev, Russia) and started to study Lutheran theology at the University of Königsberg (officially called Albertus-Universität in German), but volunteered for the German Imperial Army at the outbreak of World War I. After the war, he worked as a journalist and became the chief editor of a local newspaper in Greifswald. He was dismissed as editor in 1935 because of his critical attitude towards the Nazis. Liedtke was conscripted into the Wehrmacht in 1939. He was deployed in Poland, Belgium and Piraeus (Greece).

== Przemyśl deportations ==
In July 1942, Liedtke became the military commander of Przemyśl. On 26 July 1942, the SS, Gestapo and the GPK (Grenzpolizeikommissariat – Frontier Police Authority) prepared to launch their first large-scale "resettlement" action against the Jews from the ghetto in Przemyśl, part of Operation Reinhard, the most deadly phase of the Holocaust.

Liedtke's adjutant, Oberleutnant Albert Battel, requested that those working for the Wehrmacht be retained and gave orders to block the bridge over the River San, the only route of deportation from the ghetto. As the SS attempted to cross to the other side, the Wehrmacht troops under Liedtke's command threatened to open fire unless the SS withdrew. The same afternoon, permission was granted, and an army detachment under the command of Battel entered the cordoned-off area of the ghetto and evacuated 80–100 Jews and their families to the barracks of the local military command. These Jews were placed under the protection of the Wehrmacht and were thus sheltered from deportation to the Belzec extermination camp.

Liedtke was dismissed as military commander of Przemyśl on 30 September 1942, most likely because of this incident. He was assigned to the 1st Panzer Army, which fought in the Caucasus. Liedtke remained in service and was evacuated to Bornholm in early 1945. He was among the German soldiers captured by the Soviets who occupied Bornholm at the end of World War II. He was transferred to the Soviet Union and sentenced for alleged war crimes committed in Russia. Liedtke died in Soviet custody at Vorkutlag, the Vorkuta Gulag near Vorkuta, situated north of the Arctic Circle, in 1955.

On 24 June 1993 Yad Vashem officially recognized Liedtke as one of the Righteous Among the Nations.

== Literature ==
- Grewolls, Grete (2011). Wer war wer in Mecklenburg und Vorpommern. Das Personenlexikon (in German). Rostock: Hinstorff Verlag. p. 5882. ISBN 978-3-356-01301-6.

== See also ==
- Jewish ghettos in German-occupied Poland
