= Otto Weidt =

German resistance member (1883–1947)

Otto Max August Weidt (2 May 1883 – 22 December 1947) was the owner of a workshop in Berlin for the blind and deaf. During the Holocaust, he fought to protect his Jewish workers against deportation and he has been recognised for his work as one of the Righteous Men of the World's Nations. The Museum of Otto Weidt's Workshop for the Blind remains on the original site of the factory and is dedicated to his life.

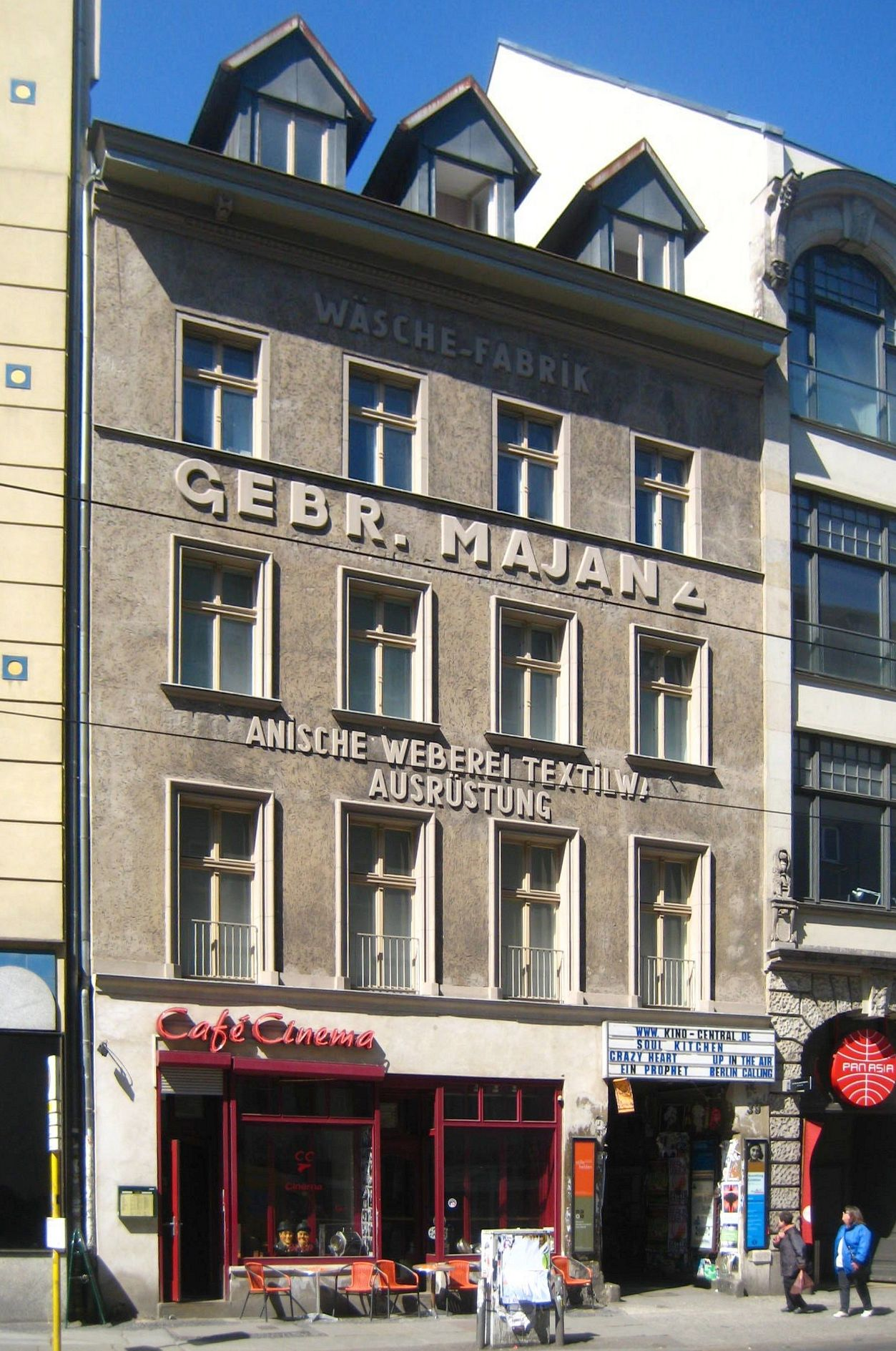
Rosenthaler Straße 39, Berlin

== Life ==
Otto Weidt was born on 2 May 1883 to Max Weidt and Auguste Weidt, née Grell, in Rostock. He grew up in modest circumstances, attended elementary and high school and like his father, became a paperhanger. Soon after the Weidt family moved to Berlin he became involved in anarchist and pacifist circles of the German working-class movement. With decreasing eyesight he learned the business of brush making and broom binding. He avoided the draft for World War I due to an ear infection.

In 1936 Weidt established a workshop to manufacture brooms and brushes in the cellar apartment of Großbeerenstraße 92 in Berlin-Kreuzberg, which was in close proximity to his apartment at Hallesches Ufer 58. In 1940 he moved to the backyard of 39 Rosenthaler Straße in Berlin-Mitte. As one of his customers was the Wehrmacht, Weidt managed to have his business classified as vital to the war effort. Up to 30 blind and deaf Jews were employed at his shop between the years of 1941 and 1943. When the Gestapo began to arrest and deport his Jewish employees, he fought to secure their safety by falsifying documents, bribing officers and hiding them in the back of his shop with the help of others such as Hedwig Porschütz. Though Weidt, forewarned, kept his shop closed on the day of the Fabrikaktion in February 1943, many of his employees were deported. Among those he was able to save were Inge Deutschkron and Alice Licht, both non-blind young women in their twenties, and Hans Israelowicz. Nevertheless, Alice Licht travelled to Theresienstadt to join her deported parents, where Weidt could support them with food parcels. All of 150 parcels arrived. Eventually Alice was deported to Auschwitz-Birkenau herself. She managed to send a postcard to Weidt who promptly traveled to Auschwitz in attempt to help her. Weidt found out that as Auschwitz was emptied, Alice was moved to the labor camp/ammunition plant Christianstadt. He hid clothes and money for her in a nearby pension to aid her return, and traveled back to Berlin. Alice eventually managed to return to Berlin in January 1945, and lived in hiding with the Weidts until the end of the war. She left when she received a visa to enter the US.

After the war, Otto Weidt established an orphanage for survivors of the concentration camps. He died of heart failure only 2 years later, in 1947, at 64 years of age. His wife Else Weidt continued his workshop until the Wirtschaftsamt of the East-Berlin Magistrate dissolved it in 1952. She died 8 June 1974.

== Posthumous honors ==
On September 7, 1971, Yad Vashem recognized Weidt as a Righteous Man of the World's Nations.

In 1993, Inge Deutschkron affixed a plaque honoring Weidt at the site of the workshop and in 1994, an Ehrengrab in the Zehlendorf cemetery was established. In 1999, a museum at the site of the workshop opened, since 2005 run by the Memorial to the German Resistance foundation. Also on the initiative of Inge Deutschkron, the construction of a square in Europacity, named Otto-Weidt-Platz, was started in Berlin in 2018.

The 88-minute film A Blind Hero: The Love of Otto Weidt focusing on the years 1941–1945 and Weidt's relationship with Alice Licht followed a book by Heike Brückner von Grumbkow and Jochen von Grumbkow with the same title, and aired January 6, 2014 on German television channel ARD.

== Literature ==
- (in German) Inge Deutschkron, Lukas Ruegenberg: Papa Weidt: Er bot den Nazis die Stirn. Butzon & Bercker, Kevelaer 2001, ISBN 3-7666-0210-1.
- (in German) Robert Kain: Otto Weidt. Anarchist und „Gerechter unter den Völkern“ (Schriften der Gedenkstätte Deutscher Widerstand / Reihe A / Analysen und Darstellungen; Band 10). Lukas Verlag, Berlin 2017, ISBN 978-3-86732-271-3 (Reading sample Online (in German)).
- (in German) Robert Kain: Pierre Ramus’ Begegnung mit dem späteren „Stillen Helden“ Otto Weidt. In: Erkenntnis, Jg. 19, Nr. 19 (2011), S. 82–89.
- (in German) Robert Kain: Otto Weidt: Vom Anarchisten zum „Gerechten unter den Völkern“. In: Hans Coppi, Stefan Heinz (Hrsg.): Der vergessene Widerstand der Arbeiter – Gewerkschafter, Kommunisten, Sozialdemokraten, Trotzkisten, Anarchisten und Zwangsarbeiter. Dietz, Berlin 2012, ISBN 978-3-320-02264-8, S. 185–198.
- (in Japanese) Noriko Oka:"A Person with disabled who resisted Nazis, Blind man Otto Weidt's rescue the Jews(Nachisu ni aragatta shougaisha Moujin Otto Weidt no Yudaya jin kyuen)", Akashi Shoten, Japan 07/2020, ISBN：978-4-7503-5037-0
