= Katharina Bayerwaltes =

Katharine Bayerwaltes
- Born: Katharine Rehtmann; January 20, 1914; Gelsenkirchen, Germany
- Died: June 11, 2011 (aged 97); Bonn, Germany
- Other names: Katia Bayerwaltes
- Occupation: Accountant
- Known for: Saving a Jewish family during World War II, reconstruction of Bonn
- Awards: Righteous Among the Nations (2005)

Katharina Bayerwaltes (née Rehtmann; January 20, 1914 – June 11, 2011) hid a Jewish family of three — Henriette and Salomon Jacoby and their daughter Hildegard Jacoby Schott — during World War II. She received the title Righteous Among the Nations in 2005, with a memorial presentation in 2006. Others who also helped conceal the Jacobs received the title, Josephine Odenthal, Heinz Odenthal, and Josephine's mother Sibylla Cronenberg.

Following the war, she worked for the Allied City Commander to rebuild the city. She also coordinated the partnership, or twin cities, between Bonn and Oxford, England.

== Life ==
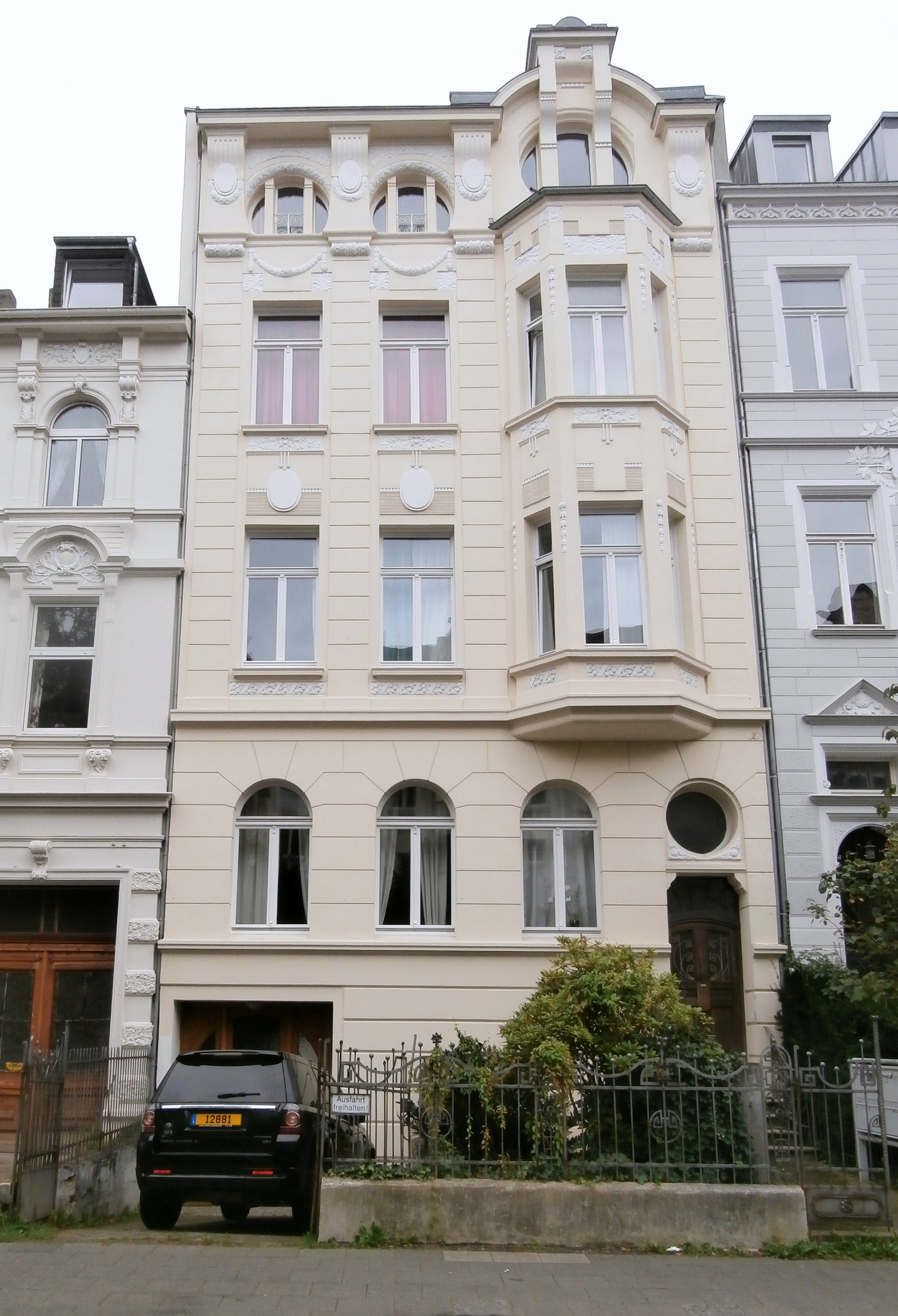
An example of the narrow juxtaposing houses on Argelanderstrasse in Bonn where the Bayerwaltes lived.

Katharina Rehtmann was born in Gelsenkirchen on January 20, 1914. She married a court trainee, becoming Katharina Bayerwaltes. During World War II, her husband was an officer of the Wehrmacht who was assigned to the Russian Front (Eastern Front). The couple had an infant baby in 1943. Bayerwaltes lived and worked in Bonn, where she was an accountant for a factory. The Bayerwaltes lived on Argelanderstrasse in the Gründerzeit area of southern Bonn.

== World War II ==
Bayerwaltes took in 72-year-old Henriette and 77-year-old Saloman Jacoby, as well as their daughter Hildegard Jacoby Schott, to live in an apartment in her building during World War II. The Jacobys were from Cologne where their family department store, Kauf Jacoby, was confiscated by the Nazi regime in 1939. When Jews in Cologne were arrested and held at the Müngersdorf camp by the beginning of 1942, Josephine Odenthal and Heinz Odenthal, their neighbors, helped them escape the camp and took them to the home of Sibylla Cronenberg in Remagen-Rolandseck, south of Bonn. Cronenberg, Josephine Odenthal's mother, owned the Zum Anker hotel. The Jacobys lived with Cronenberg until May 1943 when she was hospitalized with an illness.

The story about their background was that their home in Cologne was bombed and the Jacobys were relatives of the Odenthals who need a residence. The Odenthals saved them from being three of the 7,000 or so Cologne Jewish people who were ultimately transported to concentration camps.

The Jacobys left Cronenberg's home about May 1943 and went to live in an apartment in Bayerwaltes building. Henrietta was injured when she fell down the stairs in December 1943. Bayerwaltes took care of Henrietta, guessing that the family were Jews and realizing that they could not call for a doctor. She helped take care of the family's needs and did not tell her husband that the Jacobys were Jewish.

Bayerwaltes' husband was home on leave when Bonn was bombed, sometime between October and December 1944. The soldier moved his family to Schlegeshaid to live with his parents. The Jacobys remained in the apartment through the war, with periodic visits from the Odenthals to bring them food and supplies. Bayerwaltes returned to her home in February 1945, to see if her home has been bombed and if the Jacobys were safe.

American forces came through Bonn on March 9, 1945, liberating its citizens.

== After the war ==
Henrietta and Saloman Jacoby moved to Bad Godesberg, with Bayerwaltes helping them find an apartment. Both of the elder Jacobys died within a year or two. Hildegard became a widow during the war: her husband Leo Schott was deported to Shanghai and was exterminated there during the war. Hildegard learned of his death after the war. Hildegard lived on until 1980, and stayed in contact with Bayerwaltes. Cronenberg lived with a relative who took care of her in Kirn, after having lived in Bad Kreuznach.

The people who helped the Jacobys — Josephine and Heinz Odenthal, Kathrina Bayerwaltes, and Sibylla Cronenberg — received the title of Righteous Among the Nations on May 25, 2005. Katharina Bayerwaltes was honored in 2006 in the Old Town Hall of Bonn by Lord Mayor Bärbel Dieckmann. Their names are on a memorial wall in Jerusalem.

== Rebuilding Bonn ==
Bayerwaltes received a position working for the occupying allied forces to rebuild the city. She reported to Edward Brown, the city commander. Bayerswalte was instrumental in the partnership of the city of Bonn and Oxford, England. She was nominated to have a street in Bonn named after her. Upon her death, Mayor Jürgen Nimptsch said "Katharina Bayerwaltes is one of those quiet people who do a lot of good in the background without making a fuss about it. The city of Bonn will honor her memory."
