= Ludwig Wörl =

Ludwig Wörl (1906 – 27 August 1967) was a carpenter by profession. He was an opponent of Nazism, and as a result of his actions, was imprisoned for 11 years in different Nazi concentration camps, including Dachau and Auschwitz. He received the title of Righteous Among the Nations file #1 (the first to be recognized) for rescuing Jews in concentration camps.

== Activity during WWII ==
One of Wörl's anti-Nazi activities was to publish information booklets to the general public in Munich about the terrible conditions in the Nazi concentration camps. This action caused his imprisonment in Dachau 1934, by the Gestapo. After nine months in a detention cell, he was first transferred to the camp's carpentry shop and eventually became a paramedic in the medical clinic. He had no more than basic medical knowledge. After being trained to make X-ray images, in 1939 he was put in charge of the entire polyclinic.

Towards the end of 1939, Wörl was transferred for a period of five months to KZ Flossenbürg. Here Wörl was active as a nurse as well. He saved the life of future SPD-leader Kurt Schumacher, who suffered from a heart disorder. In March 1940 he was back in Dachau. In August 1942. He was put on a penal transport to Auschwitz on charges of having listened to a foreign radio station in the radiology department. His destination was Auschwitz.

== Auschwitz ==
In 1942, there was an outbreak of typhus in Auschwitz, that resulted in the deaths of tens of thousands of Auschwitz prisoners and personnel. During his imprisonment in Auschwitz, Wörl stayed in the Stammlager as well as in Monowitz. He was registered as prisoner 60363.

Soom he was appointed as the Blockältester (the block elder) of the hospital barracks in the Stammlager. At the end of October 1942 Wörl was transferred to Auschwitz III in Monowitz, where he was put in charge of the camp hospital for five months. Combatting spotted typhus was one of his tasks. After that, he was brought back to the main camp.

Both in the main camp as in Monowitz, Wörl employed Jewish doctors, against the express orders of the SS, and saved them from certain death. Wörl, who cared for the health of his patients in the camp, put his life at constant risk in order to obtain the minimum medical equipment for the treatment of the prisoners. He would falsify patient data lists, in order to save them from the gas chambers. As a result of consistent opposition to the orders of SS doctors aimed at deciding the number of patients, in August 1943 Wörl was arrested and re-imprisoned in an isolated detention cell.

After his release, by virtue of his German descent and seniority, he served as Block Elder in Block 15. In January 1944 Wörl was appointed Lagerältester (Camp Elder) in the Auschwitz main camp.

== Other camps ==
At the end of July 1944, Wörl was transferred to a forced-labour camp, called Güntergrube, which was located near Auschwitz. Here he was also appointed camp elder. In this role, he protected 600 Jewish prisoners who had been abused by the German kapos. He made sure that they would get the clothes and food they needed despite the unequal distribution that took place in the camp. Wörl acted openly for the Jews and their rights and looked for the best way to gain their trust.

He worked tirelessly for the Jews, created among them the idea of underground action and mass flight, raised the Jewish morale, and gave many prisoners hope that the end of this difficult time was near.

In January 1945 Wörl was sent on a death march, he and other inmates were forced to cover on foot, from Rybnik to Racibórz, a distance of some 15.5 miles. The evacuation continued by train to KZ Mauthausen in Austria. Here he was posted to an Arbeitskommando (work commando) which was put to work at a railway station outside the camp. Later Wörl was transferred to Ebensee, a subcamp of Mauthausen, which was liberated by the Americans on May 6.

== After the war ==
After the war, Wörl was in charge of the Auschwitz Prisoners' Organization in Germany. He remained a clear anti-Nazi even after the war, and searched for the SS soldiers from the camps. In addition, Wörl devoted his life to commemorating Nazi crimes and prosecuting the perpetrators. In 1963 he was one of the main witnesses at the Auschwitz trial in Frankfurt. Testifying against his own countrymen made him many enemies. He began receiving anonymous letters that mocked and threatened him.

Until his death on 27 August 1967, he appeared in public assemblies and showed documents he had collected about the concentration camps in plays and films. On 19 March 1963, Yad Vashem recognized Ludwig Wörl as a Righteous Among the Nations.
