= Inge Deutschkron =

German-Israeli journalist and author (1922–2022)

- ינגה דויטשקרון
- Born: 23 August 1922; Finsterwalde, Brandenburg, Prussia, Germany
- Died: 9 March 2022 (aged 99); Berlin, Germany
- Occupations: Journalist and author
- Organizations: Maariv
- Awards: Moses Mendelssohn Prize; Rahel Varnhagen Medal; Carl von Ossietzky Prize; Honorary citizen of Berlin

Inge Deutschkron (Hebrew: ינגה דויטשקרון; 23 August 1922 – 9 March 2022) was a German and Israeli journalist and author. She experienced the Nazi regime as a girl and young woman, living in Berlin first working in a factory, then hiding with her mother.

After World War II, she travelled the world, and became a journalist. In 1958, she was hired as a correspondent by the Israeli newspaper Maariv. After reporting from the Frankfurt Auschwitz trials in 1963, she became an Israeli citizen and moved to Tel Aviv in 1972. She worked as a journalist until 1988, dedicated to international and Middle East politics. She lived as a freelance writer in Tel Aviv and Berlin, where she was active keeping alive the memory of the Holocaust, especially the silent heroes who helped Jews during the time. Her 1978 autobiography I Wore the Yellow Star was adapted to a stage version by the Grips-Theater in Berlin.

== Life ==
Deutschkron was born in Finsterwalde, the daughter of Ella and Martin Deutschkron. Her father was a Jewish secondary school teacher, who moved the family to Berlin in 1927, but by 1933 was fired by the Nazi regime. He was able to take refuge in Great Britain in 1939, leaving his wife and daughter in Berlin.

Between 1941 and 1943, Deutschkron worked for Otto Weidt in his brush workshop for mainly deaf and blind workers (a large proportion of whom were Jewish), and it was with his help that Deutschkron managed to evade deportation. From January 1943, she lived illegally in Berlin, hiding with her mother in order to survive.

After World War II, Deutschkron and her mother moved to London in 1946 joining her father, where she studied foreign languages and became a secretary to the Socialist International organisation. From 1954 she traveled to India, Burma, Nepal and Indonesia before eventually returning in 1955 to Germany, where she worked in Bonn as a freelance journalist.

In 1958, the Israeli newspaper Maariv hired her as a correspondent, and she acted as an observer for Maariv at the Frankfurt Auschwitz trials in 1963. She became an Israeli citizen in 1966. Moving to Tel Aviv in 1972, Deutschkron was editor of Maariv until 1988, dedicated to international and Middle East politics.

She returned to Berlin in December 1988 for the stage adaptation of her 1978 autobiography I Wore the Yellow Star at the Grips-Theater, where it was titled Ab heute heißt du Sara. In the same month of 1988, she also visited a high school student theatre production of the same play at Gymnasium Tutzing, Bavaria, which received a phone bomb threat on opening night, but which was performed nonetheless in her presence without interruption.From 1992, Deutschkron lived as a freelance writer in Tel Aviv and Berlin, but made Berlin her permanent home in 2001.

Deutschkron strived to ensure that people who rescued Jews from the Nazi regime were acknowledged, overseeing the work of the Museum of Otto Weidt and the Silent Heroes Museum in Berlin. She wrote a number of books for children and adults on her life and the life of Weidt. She also worked in schools as an eyewitness of the Holocaust.

Her last residence was a senior citizen's home in Berlin. Deutschkron died on 9 March 2022, at the age of 99.

== Awards ==
In 1994, Deutschkron was awarded the Moses Mendelssohn Prize and Rahel Varnhagen von Ense Medal. She repeatedly rejected the German Order of Merit of the Federal Republic of Germany because many former Nazis also received it, but in 2002 received the Order of Merit of Berlin, awarded in "recognition and appreciation of outstanding contributions to the city of Berlin".

In 2008, Deutschkron was awarded the Carl von Ossietzky Prize for contemporary history and politics, acknowledging her "life's work is the sign of the continuing commitment to democracy and human rights and against all forms of racism." She was also awarded the Louise Schroeder Medal in 2008, given annually in memory of Louise Schroeder to those who make "particularly outstanding contributions to democracy, peace, social justice and equality".

In 2018, Deutschkron became an honorary citizen of Berlin.

== Publications ==
Deutschkron wrote a number of books in German:

- Ich trug den gelben Stern (I Wore the Yellow Star). Cologne 1978, ISBN 3-8046-8555-2
- Israel und die Deutschen: Das schwierige Verhältnis (Israel and the Germans: The Difficult Relationship). Cologne 1983.
- ... denn ihrer war die Hölle: Kinder in Gettos und Lagern (Children in the Ghettos and Camps). Cologne 1985, ISBN 3-8046-8565-X
- Milch ohne Honig: Leben in Israel (Milk Without Honey: Life in Israel). Cologne 1988, ISBN 3-8046-8719-9
- Ich trug den gelben Stern. Munich 1992
- Mein Leben nach dem Überleben (My Life After Survival). Cologne 1992, ISBN 3-8046-8785-7
- Sie blieben im Schatten: Ein Denkmal für "stille Helden" (They Stayed in the Shadows: A Monument to Silent Heroes). Berlin 1996, ISBN 3-89468-223-X
- Mein Leben nach dem Überleben. Munich 2000
- Emigranto: Vom Überleben in fremden Sprachen. Berlin 2001, ISBN 3-8874-7159-8
- Papa Weidt: Er bot den Nazis die Stirn (Papa Weidt: He Defied the Nazis). Kevelaer 2001, ISBN 3-7666-0210-1 (with Lukas Ruegenberg)
- Offene Antworten: Meine Begegnungen mit einer neuen Generation, Berlin 2004, ISBN 3-8874-7186-5
- Wir entkamen. Berliner Juden im Untergrund. Gedenkstätte Deutscher Widerstand, Beiträge zum Widerstand 1933–1945, Berlin (2007)
- Auschwitz war nur ein Wort. Berichte über den Frankfurter Auschwitz-Prozess 1963–1965, Metropol-Verlag Berlin 2018, ISBN 978-3-86331-417-0
