= Johanna Eck =

German woman, honored as one of the Righteous Among Nations (1888–1979)

Johanna Eck (born January 4, 1888, as Johanna Opitz – died September 27, 1979) was a German woman who saved four people during the Holocaust. She was honored as one of the Righteous among Nations.

== Biography ==
Born and raised in Berlin, Johanna Eck became close friends with the Jewish family of one of her husband's comrades from World War I. When deportations began, she hid one of the family (Heinz Guttmann); she would go on to hide another Jewish woman (Elfriede Guttmann, no relation to Heinz). She hid them and two others in her apartment in Berlin.

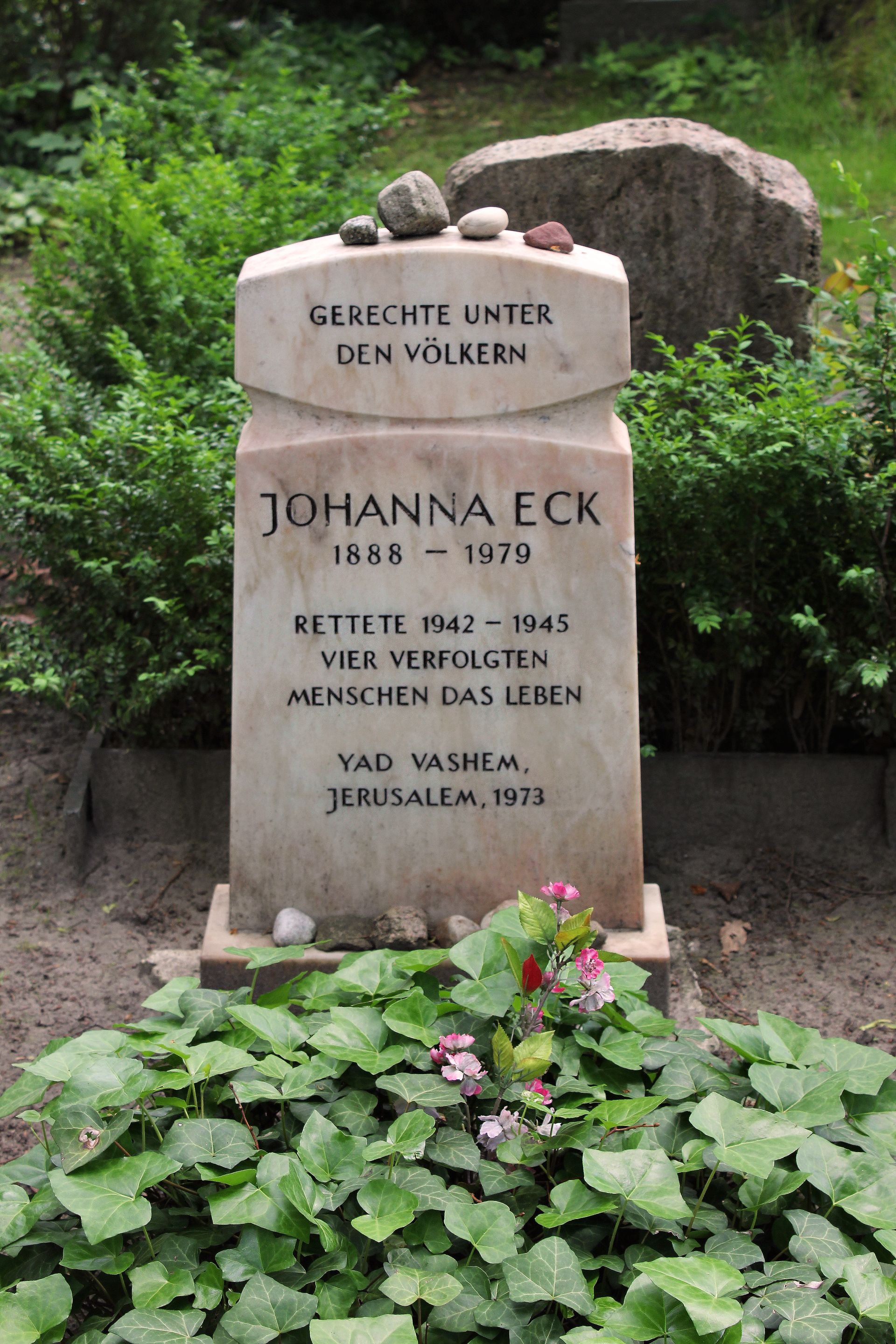
Grave of Johanna Eck in Berlin.

Eck was a housewife and former nurse. She described her reason to save others as "nothing special," remarking that "Human beings—so it seems to me—make up a big unity; they strike themselves and all in the face when they do injustice to each other." Eck's story has often been used as an example of an ordinary person who resisted Nazi violence.

She was buried in the graveyard at the church of St. Matthias in Berlin.

== Honors ==
She was honored as one of the Righteous among Nations by Yad Vashem in the early 1970s.

The Johanna Eck School, a secondary school in Berlin, was renamed in her honor in 2014. Since 2002, the school has honored Eck by taking care of her grave as part of its religious education classes. The school is known for its efforts to serve refugee children.

She has been featured in a play about genocide education.
