= Willi Ahrem =

German businessman

- Born: January 1, 1902; Wuppertal, Germany
- Died: June 20, 1967 (aged 65); Wuppertal, Germany
- Known for: Concealed, protected, and fed Jewish people during World War II

Willi Ahrem (January 1, 1902 – June 20, 1967) was a German businessman and Wehrmacht officer who was recognized as Righteous Among the Nations for his efforts to save Jewish people during the Holocaust. As a commander of the forced-labor camp Arbeitslager, operated by the Todt organization in Nemyriv, Ukraine during World War II he used his authority to protect Jewish prisoners from execution by employing them in construction projects and sheltering them from Nazi persecution. At that time, Ukraine was part of the Union of Soviet Socialist Republics (USSR), until it was occupied by the Germans.

Ahrem facilitated the escape of several Jewish individuals, including the Menczer family, whom he helped relocate to the relative safety of a Romanian-controlled ghetto in Transnistria. He also provided food, clothing, and financial support to Jews in hiding, often at great personal risk. After the war, Ahrem was imprisoned by American forces and later resumed his family's business in Wuppertal,

Ahrem received the title Righteous Among the Nations in 1965, in recognition of his bravery and humanitarian actions.

== Life ==
Willi Ahren was born on January 1, 1920, in the Elberfeld area of Wuppertal, Germany, where he lived throughout adulthood. His father Ewald Ahrem ran his own export company. Before the war, Ewald was a member of the Deutsche Demokratische Partei (German Democratic Party) of the Weimar Republic (1918–1933). Ahrem participated in the Wandervogel youth movement (1896–1933). He graduated from college with a degree in business.

Ahrem was a soldier during World War I. He worked for his father's export firm, during which he traveled to Canada, Australia, New Zealand, and South Africa. He became a partner in his father's firm in 1930, and he continued to travel and be away from his family a great deal of the time. He married Elly Fix in 1931 and they had a son and three daughters.

Although Ahrem did not closely follow the news, both father and son hated the anti-semitic rhetoric and actions of the Nazi regime and Ahrem was particularly horrified by Kristallnacht (November 9–10, 1938), when the state instigated the pogrom against Jews.

== World War II ==
=== Wehrmacht ===
Ahrem was drafted in the spring of 1941. He went through infantry training for the Wehrmacht in Munster and was first assigned as an interpreter. He attended services conducted by Clemens August Graf von Galen, Bishop of Munster at that time. By September of that year, he was reassigned to manage construction work in Ukraine for the Organisation Todt (OT), who reported to through the German military. By October, Germany occupied Reichskommissariat Ukraine.

Ahrem was responsible for the expansion of Durchgangsstrasse IV, a main supply route through Ukraine for the Wehrmacht. There were few forced-labor projects that used Jewish people in Ukraine, but this was a major project for the Nazis. After the work was done, the Jews who worked on the road were to be executed, as part of the overall plan that had executed 150,000 to 200,000 Jews in Reichskommissariat Ukraine by December 1941.

=== Commander of forced-labor camp ===
As a commander, he managed a forced-labor camp (Arbeitslager) operated by the OT organization in Nemyriv, Ukraine during World War II. When Ahrem learned of the mass execution of Jews, he wanted to save Jews by employing them on the road. He asked the head of the Schutzstaffel (Nazi SS organization) task force for his assistance. Twenty skilled laborers were assigned to Ahrem. In 1941, he helped Jehoschua Menczer and his family. They had been captured by the Nazi army and were sent to the ghetto in Nemyriv and Menczer was sent to the labor camp that Ahrem managed. Members of the Schutzstaffel (Nazi SS organization) managed some of the workers, but Ahrem held the Jewish men back and only sent Ukrainian men to work for them. When in November 1941, the Germans had planned an "action" against the Jewish people, Ahrem notified Menczer, who passed on the news to other Jewish people. Some people hid in the woods and Ahrem took in the Menczer family and two other people. During the action, 2,500 people were killed when they were shot in the back. Any Jewish people that survived could return to work.

At the time of a second action, in July 1942, more Jewish people were killed. The Menczers were hidden in Ahrem's attic. Ahrem then took them and a woman Dora Salzmann to Transnistria in his car, where they lived in a ghetto in Dzhurin (Dzhuryn), Vinnytsia Oblast. It was located between the Bug and Dniester Rivers that at the time was controlled by Romania. Ahrem used money that had been donated by Jewish people. He brought food, clothing, and other supplies to the Menczers. Ahrem traveled on the pretext of taking business trips through Bucharest, during which he paid bribes to the Romanian police. While he was in the Bucharest area he relayed letters, money, and other help to Jewish people from their relatives.

Ahrem helped Jewish people by making sure that they had enough food and supplies, concealing them, providing shelter, and moving them across borders. Ahrem was among a group of people who held positions of authority within the Nazi regime who followed their conscience to protect Jewish people from being murdered. They used their positions of authority, in form of rebellion against National Socialism (Nazism), at great risk to themselves. "Jewish helpers" were treated harshly.

Ahrem became an interpreter again in May 1943. Near the end of the war, he was taken prisoner by the Americans and was held until 1946. Upon his release, he learned that his family had been shot at by Americans on a bridge at Remagen. His wife and two of his daughters were killed. One daughter and his son survived.

== After the war ==
In Romania The Nazis had been putting people in concentration camps and exterminating people, including the Dzhurin area. Many Jews also succumbed to diseases, starvation, or eventually extermination. However, the Menczer family survived the war. The son became a doctor in the United States. A Romanian Jewish woman Lisa Heumann also survived the war and she sent a letter to Yad Vashem in 1963 requesting recognition of the man, Willi Ahrem, who helped her.

Ahrem assumed the responsibility for the business his father had owned in Wuppertal, where he died on June 20, 1967. He was buried at the Bad Neuenahr cemetery. Ahrem received the title Righteous Among the Nations on June 15, 1965.

== Bibliography ==
- Kosmola, Beate (2003). "Im Reichskommissariat Ukraine: Willi Ahrem von der Organisation Todt [In the Reichskommissariat Ukraine: Willi Ahrem from the Organization Todt]". Verbotene Hilfe: Deutsche Retterinnen und Retter wahrend des Holocaust [Forbidden help: German rescuers during the Holocaust] (PDF) (in German). Auer. ISBN 3-03755-002-3.
