= Hans Walz =

German merchant

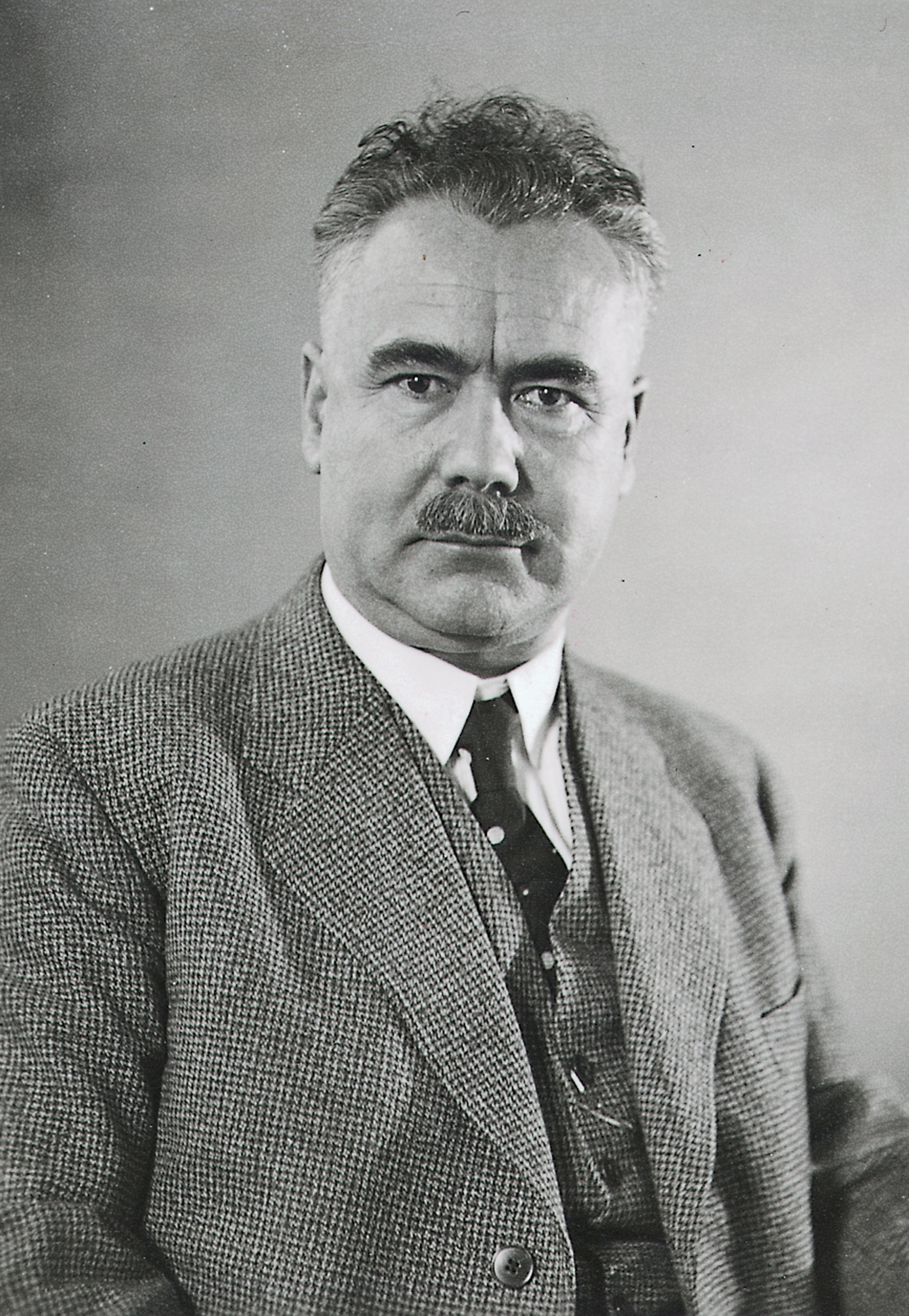
Hans Walz, 1936

Hans Walz (21 March 1883 – 23 April 1974) was a German merchant, and from 1926 to 1963 he was the managing director of Robert Bosch GmbH.

After attending high school, Walz completed a two-year apprenticeship in banking and then worked in banking and wholesale. In 1912 he occupied a commercial administrative post at Bosch and was assigned as personal secretary of Robert Bosch in its asset management. In 1919 he was appointed to the supervisory board of the company.

He was also a member of the Supervisory Board of the Stuttgart Homeopathic Hospital Society.

In the Weimar Republic Walz was a member of the Association for the Defense against Anti-Semitism as well as a friend of Karl Adler. In addition to his membership of the Committee of the Advisory Council of the Protestant Church in Württemberg, his membership led to a negative assessment brought by the Sicherheitsdienst in 1942.

In 1933, Walz and other high-ranking Bosch employees filed applications for admission in the Nazi Party (membership number 3,433,104). Admission requests were processed in late summer and fall, and Walz's membership was granted retroactively to May 1 of that year. Walz was also an SS member (membership number 155.369) and member of the Freundeskreis der Wirtschaft, where Kreis-Manager Fritz Kranefuss complained to the Reichsführer that there were "unpleasant discussions" with Walz. Nevertheless, at the end of 1943 or early 1944, he was still appointed Wehrwirtschaftsführer.

From 1938 to 1940, Walz had financed the emigration of Jews for Karl Adler, for which he was awarded the title of Righteous Among the Nations in 1969 by Israel. He is one of the few Nazi Party members to be honoured this way, along with Oskar Schindler, Georg Ferdinand Duckwitz, Helmut Kleinicke, and Karl Plagge.

In 1953, Walz was awarded the Great Cross of Merit with Star of the Federal Republic of Germany.

In 1958 and 1959, he was first treasurer of the liberal Friedrich Naumann Foundation. His mentor Robert Bosch was personally involved in Friedrich Naumann's citizenship school.

== Sources ==
- Scholtyseck, Joachim (1999). Robert Bosch und der liberale Widerstand gegen Hitler 1933 bis 1945. München: C. H. Beck. ISBN 978-3-406-45525-4.
