= Albert Battel =

German Righteous Among the Nations

- Albert Battel in occupied Poland
- Born: January 21, 1891; Klein Pramsen, German Empire
- Died: March 17, 1952 (aged 61); Hattersheim am Main, West Germany
- Military career
- Allegiance: Nazi Germany
- Branch: Wehrmacht; Volkssturm
- Service years: 1942–1944, 1945
- Known for: Resistance for the 1942 liquidation of the Przemyśl Jewish ghetto

Albert Battel (German: [ˈalbɛʁt ˈbatl̩]; 21 January 1891 – 17 March 1952) was a German Army lieutenant, lawyer and notary recognized for his resistance during World War II to the Nazi plans for the 1942 liquidation of the Przemyśl Jewish ghetto. He was posthumously recognized as Righteous Among the Nations in 1981.

== Early life ==
Battel was born in Klein-Pramsen (Prężynka), next to Neustadt (Prudnik), Prussian Silesia in 1891. After serving in the Imperial German Army in World War I, earning an iron cross on the way, he studied economics and jurisprudence at the Ludwig-Maximilians-Universität München and the University of Breslau (Wrocław). He then worked as a lawyer and notary in the interwar years. In the 1930s, he joined the Nazi Party.

== During the War ==
Battel was drawn for the Wehrmacht in 1942 as a reserve officer.

=== Przemyśl Ghetto incident ===
In 1942, Jewish ghettos throughout Poland were being rapidly liquidated, and their inhabitants deported to death camps. Therefore, when Schutzstaffel (SS) units sealed off the Przemyśl Ghetto on July 15, 1942, Lieutenant Albert Battel, a reserve officer and the local Wehrmacht military commander's adjutant, was aware of the impending fate of its residents. A number of Jews managed to escape the sealed ghetto and sought help from Battel. Battel successfully convinced his superior, Major Max Liedtke, the military commandant, that at least the Jews employed in essential war production industries should be spared.

On July 26, 1942, Battel provided protection for approximately 90 Jewish workers by sheltering them directly in the courtyard of the military headquarters. Subsequently, upon Liedtke's instruction, soldiers from the military headquarters blocked the sole bridge leading into the ghetto. When a column of SS vehicles approached the bridge around noon on July 26, the Wehrmacht units halted them. Faced with the SS's persistence, the Wehrmacht threatened to open fire if the SS proceeded, forcing the column to stand down. Meanwhile, Battel, using covered army trucks, drove into the ghetto. There, he again encountered resistance from SS officers who refused to let anyone leave. Battel openly threatened to call in a platoon of Wehrmacht soldiers and force his way through. Only then were the gates opened. Performing five round trips, Albert Battel evacuated an additional approximately 100 workers along with their families from the ghetto. The total number of rescued individuals, estimated to be around 500, were placed in military barracks under the protection of the military headquarters. The remaining Jews in the Przemyśl Ghetto were subsequently deported by the SS and perished in the Bełżec extermination camp.

=== Punishment and investigation ===
Battel justified his actions by citing the necessity of continuing military production. As a result, the Wehrmacht imposed only disciplinary measures: house arrest, the revocation of the Iron Cross award, which he had received in World War I, and a transfer to a different post. This relatively lenient treatment was due in part to the fact that an order dictating an "uncompromising mandatory attitude" for Wehrmacht officers toward Jews had not yet been issued (it was later released in October 1942).

A different matter entirely was the SS, with whom Albert Battel had entered into open conflict. Their agencies initiated a closed investigation. The investigation revealed that Battel had previously shown sympathy toward Jews. The head of the SS himself, Heinrich Himmler, took an interest in the investigation. Himmler sent a copy of the investigation materials to Martin Bormann. In the accompanying note, Himmler stated that he had ordered the arrest of Albert Battel immediately after the war.

== Post-war ==
Neither the details of the investigation nor the content of Himmler's directive were known to Battel himself. In 1944, Battel was discharged from military service due to a heart condition and returned to his native city, Breslau (now Wrocław). When Soviet forces occupied the city, he spent a period in Soviet captivity as a prisoner of war. Following his release, Battel settled in West Germany and attempted to resume his legal career as a lawyer and notary, but was denied permission by a postwar denazification court. He instead worked in a glass factory.

== Death ==
Battel died in 1952 in Hattersheim am Main, near Frankfurt from a heart attack. He was 61 years old.

== Recognition and honor ==
Battel’s stand against the SS was not recognized until years after his death, most notably through the tenacious efforts of the Israeli researcher and lawyer Dr. Zeev Goshen.

On January 22, 1981, almost 30 years after Battel's death, Yad Vashem recognized him as Righteous Among the Nations.
