= Cläre Barwitzky =

German Catholic nun (1913-1989)

- Born: 19 June 1913; Neisse, Upper Silesia, Germany
- Died: 10 March 1989 (aged 75)
- Other name: Claire Barwitzky (changed to Claire during the war to hide German identity)
- Known for: Sheltering 30 Jewish children during World War II
- Awards: Righteous Among the Nations (1969)

Cläre Barwitzky, also known as Claire Barwitzky (19 June 1913 – 10 March 1989), was a German Catholic nun who cared for 30 Jewish children refugees during World War II in a remote camp in the Alps near Chamonix and Mont Blanc. She received the posthumous title Righteous Among the Nations from Yad Vashem in 1991.

== Early life and education ==
Cläre Barwitzky was born in Neisse, Upper Silesia, the daughter of a railroad worker who worked at Deutsche Reichsbahn. The Barwitzky family lived a hand-to-mouth existence. After she graduated from high school in 1932, she went to work at Companions of the Holy Francis (Compagnons de Saint-François) in Lyon, France where she was the secretary for Father Remillieux. (Note: It is also said that she worked as an au pair in France.) (Note: The Companions of the Holy Francis promote peace and justice. The ecumenical movement brought young people from France and Germany, historically enemies, together to foster mutual understanding and peace.)

She returned to Germany by 1933 when she studied in Freiburg im Breisgau to be a spiritual assistant (Seelsorgehelferin) or pastoral assistant. Her curriculum aligned with Saint Francis of Assisi's ideology. She graduated in 1935, and became a nun.

== France ==
In 1937, Barwitzky moved to the mountain commune of Vaujany in the Auvergne-Rhône-Alpes, where there was no priest at the local Catholic Church. Reporting to the Diocese of Grenoble, she provided pastoral care, including delivering mass and preparing children for Confirmation.

Barwitzky prepared to meet the needs of refugees during Nazi Germany's occupation of France during World War II, including orphaned children. Since she was German and might be considered a spy, she tried to hide her heritage. She helped find Gentile families who would foster Jewish children. The job became dangerous when the local residents and Resistance fighters were concerned that Barwitzky's background would draw attention and jeopardize their rescue efforts.

In 1941, she went to Saint-Étienne in the Loire to work for a Catholic society that cares for families and children in need. She spoke French fluently, and her German heritage was not shared with anyone there. Wanting to protect Jewish children from arrest, the French Resistance (La Résistance) brought children to the Alps, where they were hidden in summer vacation homes. Barwitzky worked in a remote mountain camp for 30 Jewish children in Chamonix. She cared for the children, taught music, and honored their Jewish faith, praying Shema Yisrael with the children each morning. She worked with two Jewish women. Fella and Hanna Szmidt taught the children.

Of the time, she said,

We have now begun an unforgettable year of kindness and devotion to one another, trust, love, joy and sisterly cooperation. I cannot find any other time in my life that can compare to this.

— Cläre Barwitzky

The threat of getting caught, without proper identification, was a constant and escalating threat as the war proceeded. She also went to Lyons to rescue two infants while the city was being bombed. The area was liberated during the summer of 1944. At the end of the German occupation, the children returned to Saint-Étienne. Barwitzky was reported for taking care of Jewish children and was attacked.

== After the war ==
Barwitzky had participated again in the Companions of the Holy Francis events when she lived in Thuringia. Barwitzky returned to Germany after the war, where she provided pastoral care to German Catholics in Leipzig, Saalfeld, and Meiningen, chronologically. Due to poor health, Barwitzky retired in 1969. Robert Kümmert, director of Würzburg Caritas, encouraged her to write her memoirs. She died in Meiningen in 1989. In 1991, she posthumously received the title Righteous Among the Nations by the Yad Holocaust Memorial Vashem.
