= Helmut Kleinicke =

German engineer

- Kleinicke in Wehrmacht uniform (c. 1944)
- Born: 19 November 1907; Wildemann, German Empire
- Died: 1979 (aged 71); Clausthal-Zellerfeld, West Germany
- Occupation: Engineer
- Known for: Rescuing Jews during the Holocaust
- Political party: Nazi Party
- Awards: Righteous Among the Nations (2018)

Helmut Kleinicke (German: [ˈhɛlmuːt ˈklaɪnɪkə]; 19 November 1907 – 1979) was a German engineer who supervised construction projects near Auschwitz concentration camp and saved Jews during the Holocaust. Kleinicke was named Righteous Among the Nations in 2018; he is one of the few Nazi Party members to be given this award, along with Oskar Schindler, Hans Walz, Karl Plagge and Georg Ferdinand Duckwitz.

== Early life ==
Helmut Kleinicke was born on 19 November 1907 in Wildemann, in Lower Saxony, to a family of foresters. In his youth he studied civil engineering. He joined the Nazi Party in 1933. Although some survivors claimed that he had been an SS officer with the rank of Obersturmbannführer, there is no documentary evidence that Kleinicke served in the SS, and his niece denied it. In 1941, Kleinicke was recruited into the team who started the planning and construction near Auschwitz concentration camp. Having just married a woman named Cilly, eleven years his junior, he moved to Chrzanów, close to the camp.

== Rescue activities ==
In Chrzanów, Kleinicke had to pick the Jewish inhabitants who were young and able-bodied to work in the camp. Kleinicke treated his workers relatively well and made efforts to prevent transports to the death camps. He did not allow SS members to harm his employees. On many occasions, he warned Jews about upcoming roundups, rescued them from being deported, hid them in his attic and his shed, or helped them flee across the border. In late 1943, his supervisors suspected that he was helping Jews escape after noticing a trend of Jews in his care disappearing, and he was removed from his position and drafted into a Wehrmacht artillery unit to fight on the northern front. Many of his former employees who stayed after his departure survived the Holocaust and provided evidence for his deeds.

== Postwar ==
After the capitulation of Germany, Kleinicke was imprisoned by the British, and released in July 1945. In an affidavit from July 1948, Holocaust survivor Siegmund Engländer wrote that Kleinicke had saved Jews "without regard to his person", and that many of the survivors from Chrzanów owed their lives to his efforts. This and two similar letters convinced Kleinicke's denazification panel that he had not been a "convinced National Socialist". Kleinicke was exonerated in March 1949. He lived with his wife and only daughter (who was born after the war) in Clausthal-Zellerfeld. According to his daughter, he felt guilty that he had not saved more lives; he did not answer letters from the Jews that he had rescued. In January 1979, the American miniseries Holocaust was broadcast in Germany. Kleinicke watched it and was deeply affected. Three days later, he suffered a stroke, and died a few months afterwards.

At Beth Lohamei Haguetatot, Jews from Chrzanów meet annually for a reunion. Several of them survived the Holocaust because of Kleinicke's efforts. In a September 2015 documentary, Holocaust survivor Josef Königsberg testified that Kleinicke saved his life by removing him from a queue of men who were going to be deported. Spiegel Online then searched through Deutsche Dienststelle archives to corroborate the story. Yad Vashem recognized Kleinicke as Righteous Among the Nations in May 2018. The ceremony was held on 14 January 2020 at Yad Vashem, making Kleinicke the 628th German to be honoured by the organisation.
