= Aurelius Arkenau =

German priest (born 1900)

- Born: Joseph Arkenau; January 7, 1900; Essen (Oldenburg), Germany
- Died: October 19, 1991 (aged 91); Kirchherten area of Bedburg, Germany
- Occupation: Catholic priest
- Known for: Saving Christians and Jews during World War II
- Awards: Righteous Among the Nations (1998)

Aurelius Arkenau, OP (January 7, 1900 – October 19, 1991) was a German priest who helped Jewish and Christian people escape the Nazi regime. He provided food and other goods, forged identification, and shelter. He operated with other rescuers in Leipzig, all of whom survived the Holocaust. In Leipzig, he had a place named after him. On October 27, 1998, he received the title Righteous Among the Nations posthumously.

== Early life ==
Joseph Arkenau was born in Essen (Oldenburg) on January 7, 1900, the son of Christian Gerhard Arkenau (1861–1933) and Maria Arkenau (1865–1941). Arkenau, the third of six children, spent his early childhood on a farm in Essen. He was baptized at St. Bartholomäus in Essen. (Note: Yad Vashem's biography states that he was the fourth of six children.) His mother was married previously and she inherited her husband's store after his death. The Arkenau family ran the store until they moved to Brokstreek, a small village south of Essen, around the time Arkenau began attending school. He had his first communion in 1912.

He attended the Gymnasium in Meppen beginning in 1912. He completed the 10th grade of school but stopped attending school with the breakout of World War I. His brothers Gerhard and Rudolf were drafted into the army and Arkenau worked the farm.

After passing a matriculation examination, he entered the Order of Preachers as novice Aurelius in Düsseldorf. He studied theology and philosophy from 1922 to 1929, during that time he was ordained in 1928, becoming Father Aurelius Arkenau.

== Pre-war career ==
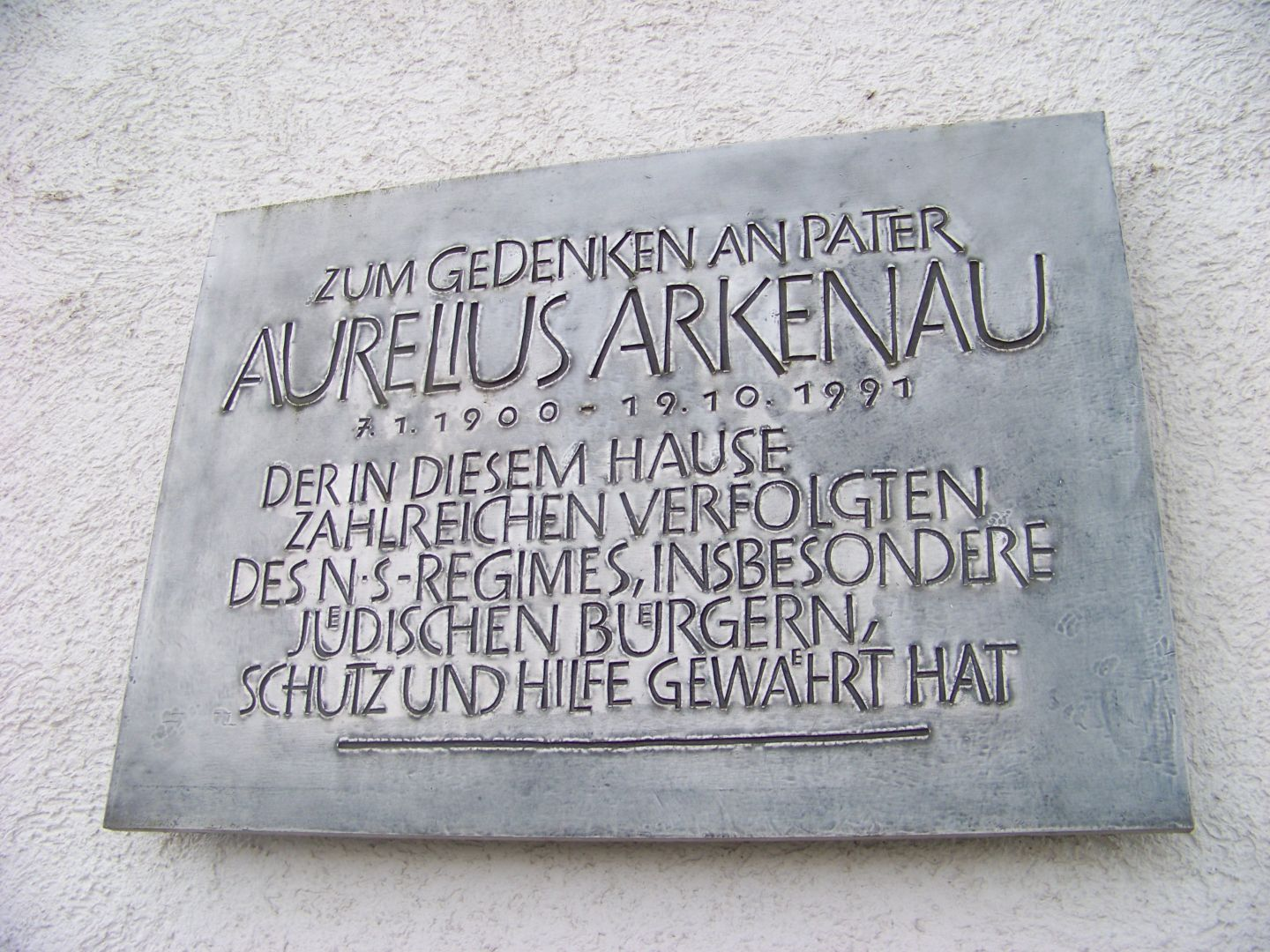
Memorial plaque for the people that Aurelius Arkenau protected was installed at the monastery in Leipzig-Wahren in 1996.

Arkenau was a priest in Berlin beginning in 1934. He went to the Wahren area of Leipzig in 1940, where he worked until February 1946. During that time, he helped 100 Jews and Christians hide and then escape during World War II. He was the pastor and became the Superior of the St. Albert Convent in Leipzig After the war, he was transferred to West Germany.

== World War II ==
When Arkenau went to Berlin in April 1934, he began to see first-hand the persecution that Jewish people were subjected to under the Nazi regime. One day he drove through the city of Magdeburg and saw Jews being processed to be sent to concentration camps in the East. He was motivated to help Jews after seeing the way that large groups were herded onto trains and how they had been persecuted and tortured. His concerns were primarily that of a Humanist, concerned about people not being treated humanely and stripped of their rights.

Working out of the monastery in Leipzig-Wahren, he helped people escape the Nazi-occupied country. He hid more than 100 people in the monastery, concealing them and providing them with false identification documents, while he sought places for them to stay. About a couple of dozen times, he was interrogated and beaten by the Gestapo. Dozens of people worked with Arkenau, including Dr. Karl Gelbke, Hildegard Kühnel, a nurse, and Erich Zeigner, who was a social democrat. Of many backgrounds and ideologies, they helped save Jews and Christians as well as soldiers who had deserted the military.

Arkenau helped a Jewish mother Käthe Leibel (who assumed the Sackarndt surname) and her son Joachim-Richard survive the Holocaust. Learning that Käthe and her son were ordered to go to a collection point, Arkenau found a place where she could safely stay with Christian families and provided ration cards and money for their survival. When they needed to move to another, safer area, he provided false identification and a place to stay in Halle. They survived through the end of the war. At Käthe's request, Richard was baptized. He helped Professor Alfred Menzel and Martin Thiele, a communist, survive the war.

Arkenau found homes for infants whose mothers had been put to death at the women's prison in Meusdorf. Arkenau, a chaplain at the prison, found families who were against fascism. He also helped working priests, and three or more daughters of captured French spies.

Arkenau, along with other clergymen, helped Jewish people and anti-fascists at their peril. The Nazis had developed campaigns to stifle religious groups and would follow, persecute, and imprison clergy in prisons or concentration camps. While some of the rescuers were interrogated and beaten, none of the Leipzig rescuers were arrested and they survived the war.

== After the war ==
Ardnt co-founded the Christian Democratic Union of Germany (CDU). In 1947, he was Superior in Vechta. He was then a missionary and chaplain in Cologne. He was elected prior in 1962 and lived in Düsseldorf. He led retreats. He lived in a Dominican nursing home in Kirchherten in his later years.

Aurelius Arkenau died in the Kirchherten area of Bedburg on October 19, 1991, and he was buried in the southern cemetery in Düsseldorf. In 1998, a square in the Wahren district of Leipzig was named Pater-Aurelius-Platz after the priest. On October 27, 1998, he received the title Righteous Among the Nations and his name was placed on Yad Vashem's wall of honor in Jerusalem. During a ceremony on August 5, 1999, at Yad Vashem, Avi Primor, the Ambassador of the State of Israel, presented the medal and certificate to the prior of the monastery.

== Bibliography ==
- "Pater Aurelius Arkenau O.P" (PDF). Leipzig.de (in German). Frakttun BC 90/The Greens in the City Council, Leipzig. November 2002.
