= Maimi von Mirbach =

German cellist

Maria Celina Gabrielle Antoinette Freiin von Mirbach (8 April 1899 in Antwerp – 8 October 1984 in Berlin), commonly known as Maimi von Mirbach (German: [ˈmaɪmi fɔn ˈmɪʁbax]), was a German cellist and member of the Confessing Church.

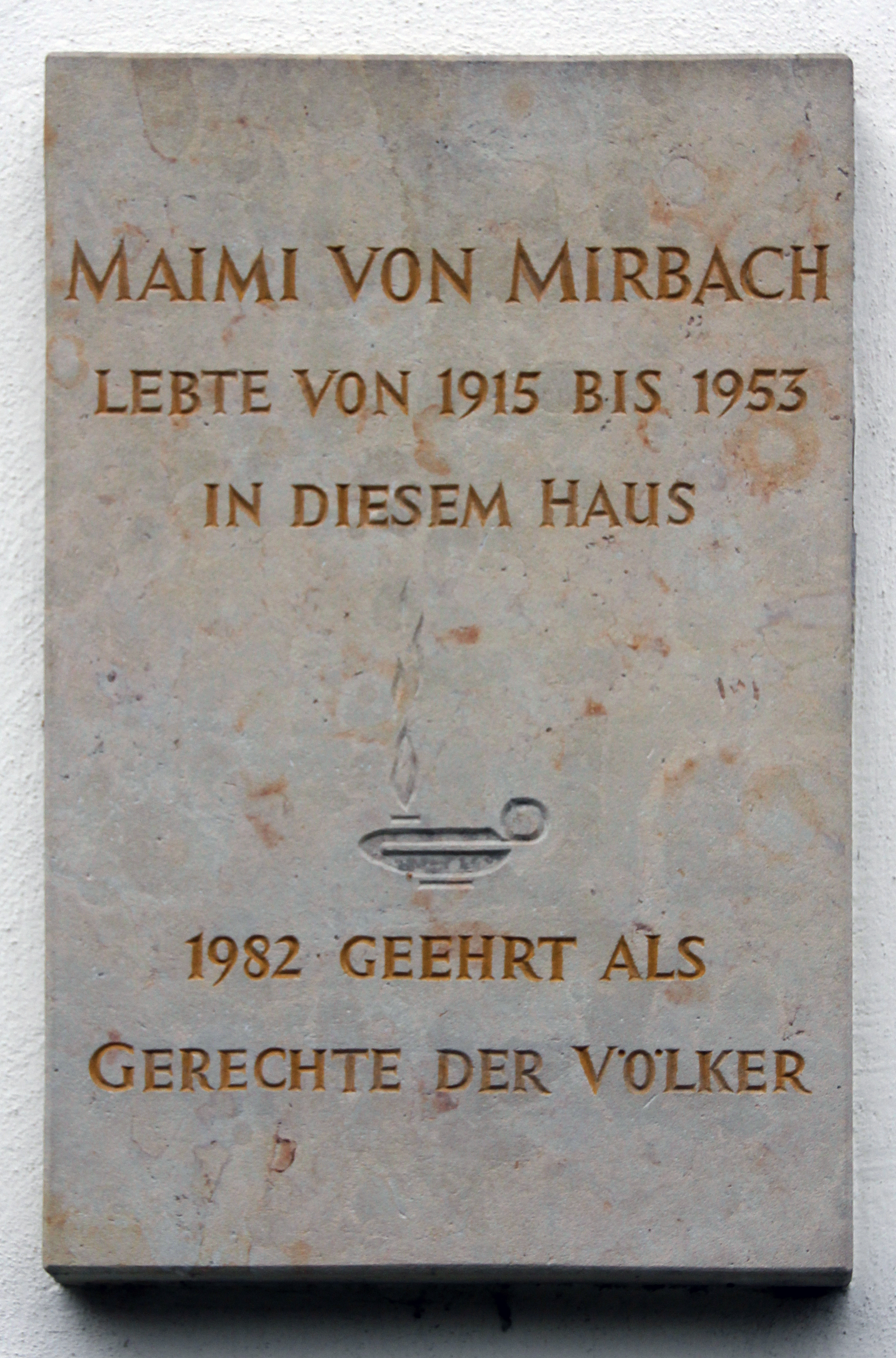
Memorial plaque at Mirbach's house, Alleestraße 10, in Potsdam

Maimi von Mirbach came from an old noble family. Her father, the merchant Wilhelm Freiherr von Mirbach (1858–1914) was a brother of the Prussian lieutenant general and court official Ernst von Mirbach (1844–1925). Through her mother Carmen Laura (née von Bary; 1876–1938), Maimi von Mirbach was directly related to Cornelio Saavedra, the first president of the United Provinces of the Rio de la Plata. In this cosmopolitan and international parental home, she enjoyed a Christian-liberal education with a strong musical orientation. In 1914, the family had to leave Belgium within 24 hours of the beginning of the First World War, moving to Potsdam.

Shaped by her experience as a member of a minority, Maimi von Mirbach turned early to people who needed help. Already in the 1920s, she recognized the nationalistic and anti-Semitic development in Germany. After the Nazi seizure of power, she helped persecuted Jews. also following the values of the Confessing Church. She abhorred the racial ideology of the Nazis and, as a cellist, continued to cultivate numerous contacts with Jewish musicians, even though this repeatedly put her in danger.

Maimi von Mirbach helped Fritz Hirschfeld, with whom she played in a private string quartet, escape in 1938. Hirschfeld, chairman of the Potsdam Labor Court for six years from 1927, was arrested after Kristallnacht and remained in Potsdam police prison for three weeks. He was only released on the condition that he would leave the country. The German authorities demanded a Reich Flight Tax of 35,000 Reichsmark and a Jewish property tax of 38,000 Reichsmark. To raise this sum, Maimi von Mirbach acquired the Hirschfelds' house and property. His "Aryan" wife Grete stayed in the house free of charge until her death in April 1941. Maimi von Mirbach gave Fritz Hirschfeld 8,000 Reichsmark in cash for his escape to Holland. In August 1942, he was deported to the Theresienstadt concentration camp and finally deported to Auschwitz, after which it is unknown what happened to him. Maimi von Mirbach visited him several times in the internment camp and gave him food, jewelry, and money.

Von Mirbach hid Jews wanted by the Gestapo in her house several times in order to save them from deportation. At the end of 1941 she accepted the former music student Gisela Distler-Brendel, a pupil of the composer and piano teacher Ilse Fromm-Michaels, as a lodger. Gisela Distler-Brendel was a "first-degree half-breed" who was not allowed to study at a university. She also had a forbidden relationship with a gentile, from whom she expected an illegitimate child. Maimi von Mirbach kept this relationship secret from the authorities, and was thus guilty of racial disgrace under the Nuremberg Laws.

After 1945, Maimi von Mirbach was subjected to many humiliations and restrictions in the Soviet occupation zone and in the early days of the GDR. In 1956, she left Potsdam and moved to Berlin-Charlottenburg. Until her death, she told students about her experiences during the period of National Socialism in schools and youth institutions.

In 2005, the Potsdam Administrative Court dismissed an action brought by Maimi von Mirbach's heirs against the reassignment to Hirschfeld's daughter Aenne Dorothy Scott of the property in Klein Glienicke lawfully acquired by Fritz Hirschfeld and expropriated by the GDR.

== Honors ==
- The State of Israel honored Maimi von Mirbach on 2 April 1981, with the title of Righteous among the Nations.
- In the Potsdam district of Kirchsteigfeld, a street was named after her in 1995.
- A plaque at Alleestraße 10 in Potsdam draws attention to the fact that Miami von Mirbach lived in this house.

== Sources ==
- Hoßfeld, Dagmar; Wullenstein, Renate (1998). Das weibliche Potsdam. Kurzbiographien aus drei Jahrhunderten. Potsdam: Verlag Schwarzdruck. ISBN 978-3-933297-00-6.
- Schnell, Gabrielle (1993). Potsdamer Frauen. 10 Frauenschicksale vom Kaiserreich bis heute. Potsdam: Argo. ISBN 978-3-910196-17-9.
