= Order of Merit of North Rhine-Westphalia =

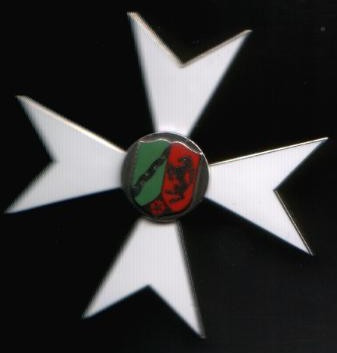
- Type: Civil order of merit
- Awarded for: Outstanding contributions to the state of North Rhine-Westphalia
- Country: Germany
- Presented by: the Minister-President of North Rhine-Westphalia
- Established: 11 March 1986

Highlights
- Total: 1,559 (as of July 2018)
- Ribbon bar of the order

Precedence
- Next (higher): State Prize of North Rhine-Westphalia (Staatspreis des Landes Nordrhein-Westfalen)

The Order of Merit of North Rhine-Westphalia (German: Verdienstorden des Landes Nordrhein-Westfalen) is a civil order of merit, of the German State of North Rhine-Westphalia. The Order of Merit of North Rhine-Westphalia was founded on 11 March 1986. It is awarded to citizens representing all segments of the population who have made extraordinary contributions to the people and state of North Rhine-Westphalia. The order is limited to 2500 living recipients. From its founding through January 2010, a total of 1,559 people have been awarded the Order of Merit of North Rhine-Westphalia.
