= Erich Klibansky Platz =

Public square in Cologne, Germany

Coordinates: 50°56′23.55″N 6°56′41.36″E

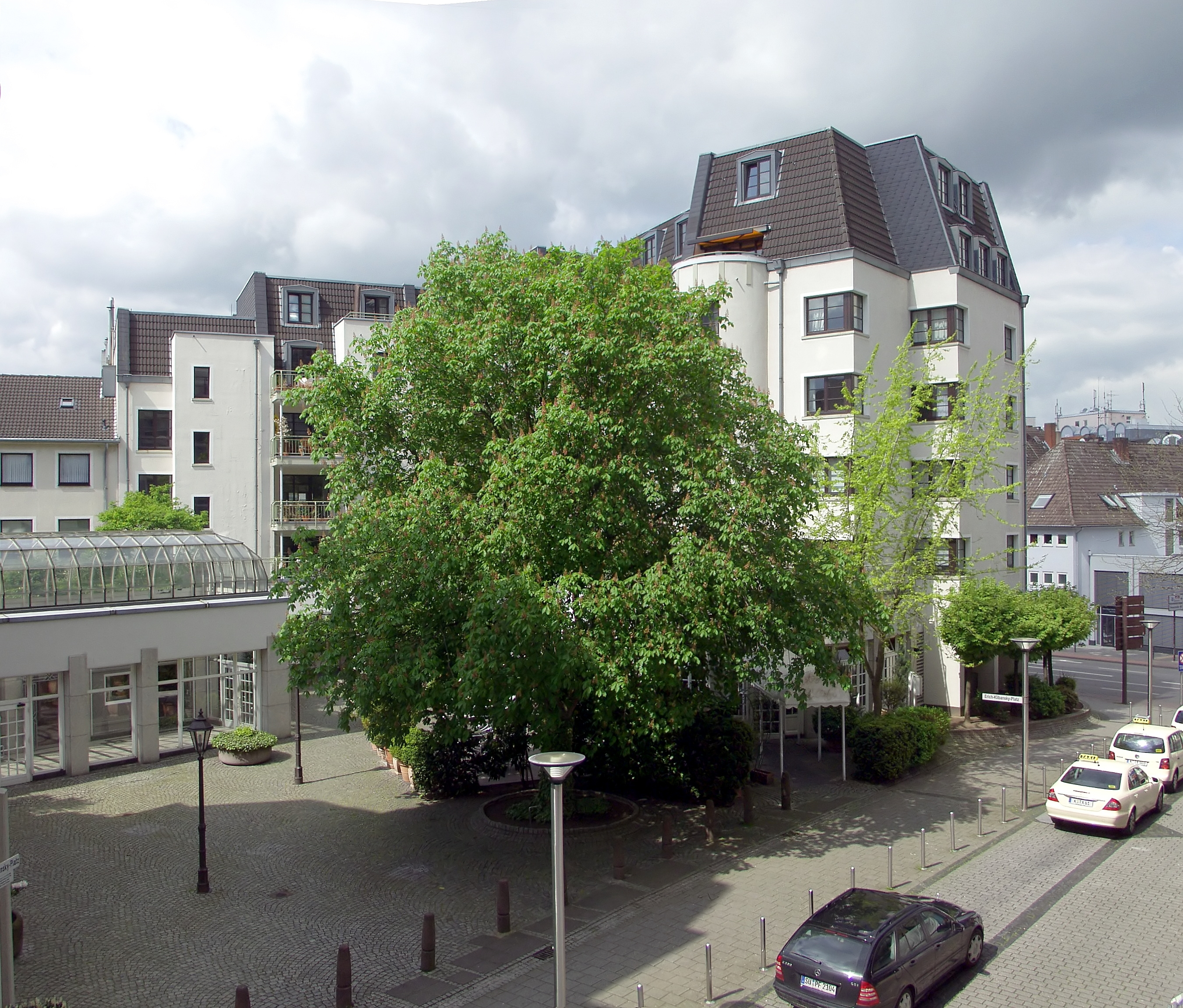
Erich Klibansky Platz

The Erich Klibansky Platz in Cologne quarter Altstadt-Nord, located on Helenenstraße, takes the name of Erich Klibansky, the one-time and last headmaster of the Reformrealgymnasium Jawne, the first Jewish Gymnasium of the Rhineland. It took his name in 1990.

== Location ==
The area of the square is small, it came into being as a result of the transformations due to World War II. The square, which is reserved to pedestrians, lies on the west end of Helenenstraße, between St.-Apern-Straße and Albertusstraße, opposite to the main entrance of the conference hotel Pullman.

It is the areal of land of the Jewish community Adass Jeschurun, where there were several school buildings and a synagogue.

== History of the square ==
Already in the middle of the 19th century, St.-Apern-Straße was a quarter where rich citizens had their homes and shops. There were many exquisite antique shops, in which mostly Jewish owners sold expensive furniture and jewels. These inhabitants built a synagogue of the orthodox community „Adass Jeschurun“ in 1884.

An affiliated teachers’ college was built in the same year. At the same time of the Jewish elementary school, the Morijah, the seat of the Cologne administrative district was built in 1907-1909 in the nearby plot on St.-Apern-Straße by Carl Moritz (the nowadays Kreishausgalerie).

In 1919 the municipality built the Reformrealgymnasium „Jawne“ in St.-Apern-Straße, which was supported by the municipality, even if private. The inside of the Synagogue was destroyed in November 1938 Kristallnacht, the school was closed in 1942. The buildings were destroyed at the end of the war.

=== Löwenbrunnen (Lion Fountain) ===
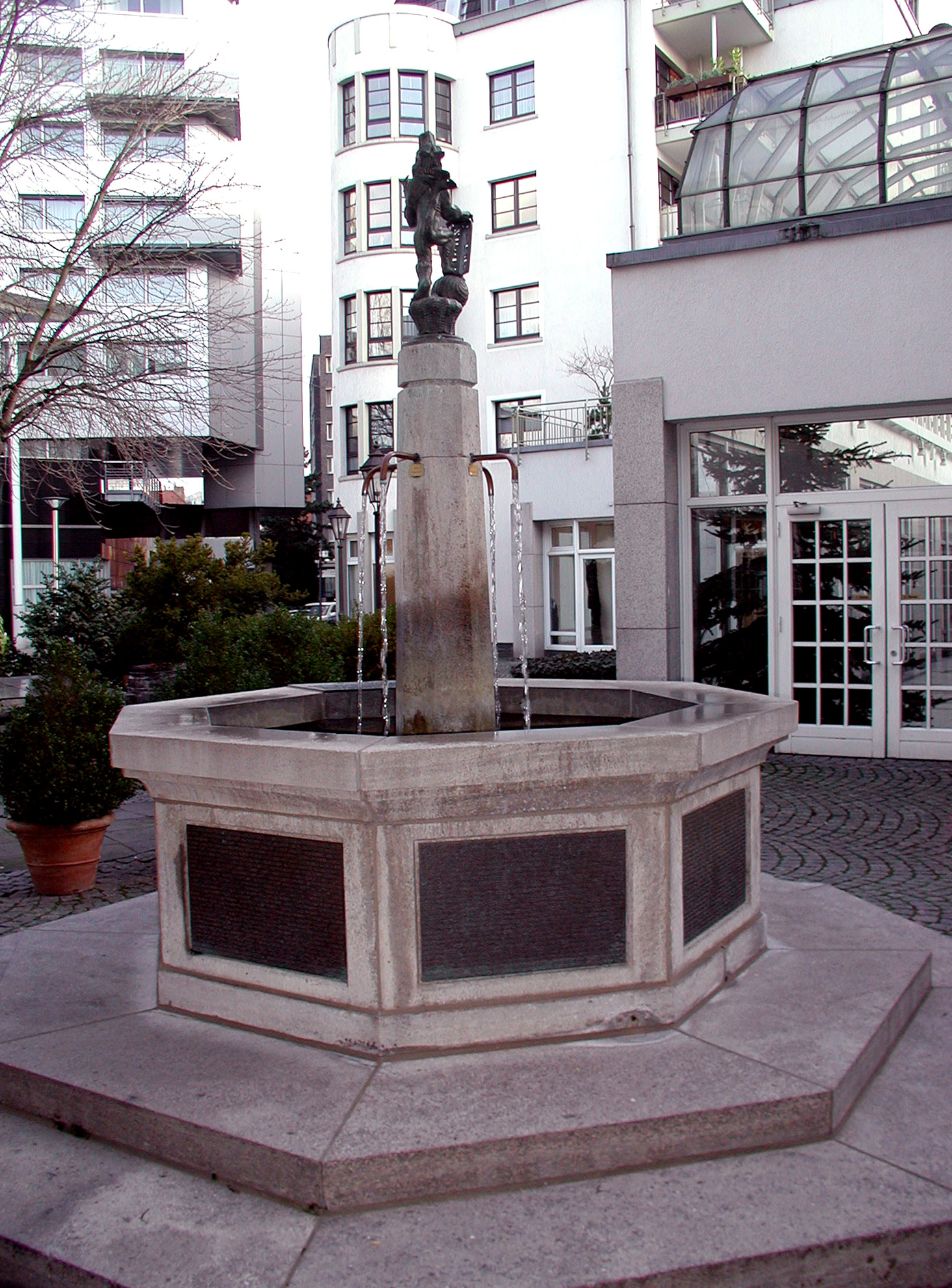
Löwenbrunnen on Erich-Klibansky-Platz

A fountain decorated with the Lion of Judah, a Gur Aryeh (Hebrew for “young lion”), commemorates the 1100 murdered Jewish children of Cologne, whose names are listed on a bronze plaque attached to the fountain basin.

The fountain also commemorates Erich Klibanksy, who was able to save 130 students by organizing for them an evacuation to Great Britain in 1938. Hermann Gurfinkel, one of these survivors, created the fountain in 1997.

=== Temporary exhibitions ===
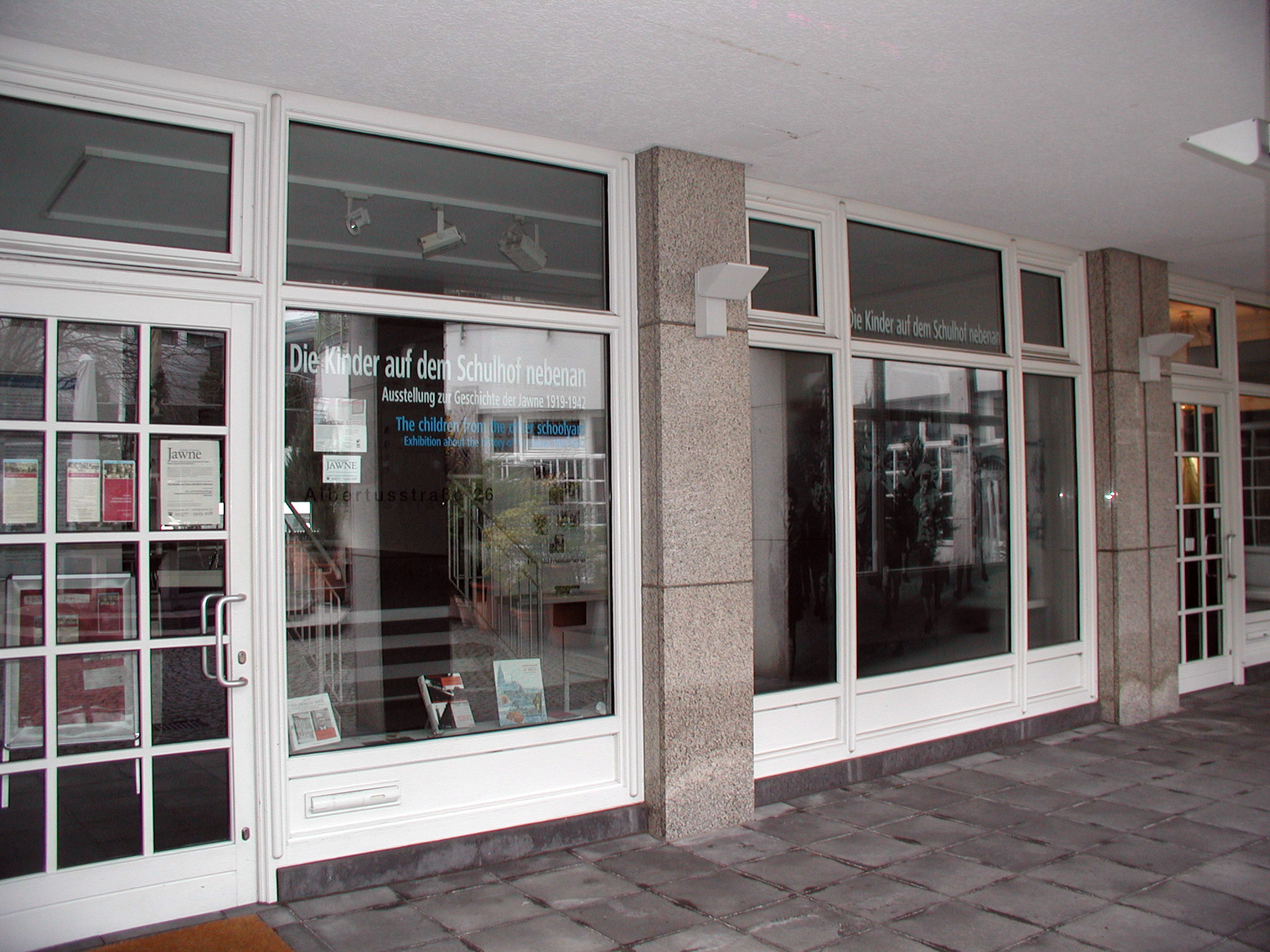
Entrance to the exhibition

Since 1980 through a yearlong research with the help of the married couple Dieter and Irene Corbach, who have committed themselves to examine the Nazi Germany history in Cologne, a lot of material has been examined and saved. Based in this collection, which after Dieter Corbach's death went to the Nazi documentation center of Cologne, a first exhibition was organized, “Jawne in Cologne”.

Mrs Corbach went on with the work after her husband's death as delegate by the Synod for the Christian-Jewish dialogue in the Right Rhine Church circle. She also fostered the contacts with Jawne students all over the world.

The current (2007) exhibition with the slogan „The children of the next door schoolyard“ regards the former buildings of the Jewish-orthodox community Adass Jeschurun in St.-Apern-Straße 29-31. With the support of the Cologne Nazi documentation center (EL-DE-Haus), it is hoped that a comprehensible information will be provided on the everyday life of a Jewish school in the 1920/30 to all the young visitors through authentic images and the mostly translated text.

== Sources ==
- Kirsten Serup-Bilfeldt Zwischen Dom und Davidstern. Jüdisches Leben in Köln. Verlag Kiepenheuer & Witsch, Köln, o. J. (2001), ISBN 3-462-03508-8
- Carl Dietmar: Die Chronik Kölns, Chronik Verlag, Dortmund 1991, ISBN 3-611-00193-7
- Adolf Kober, Cologne, The Jewish Publication Society of America, Philadelphia 1940, p. 271-272 available online
- Adolf Kober: Der Religionsunterricht der Synagogen-Gemeinde Köln. In: Jahrbuch der Synagogen- Gemeinde Köln 1934
