= NS-Dokumentationszentrum =

NS-Dokumentationszentrum may refer to:

- NS Documentation Centre of the City of Cologne
- NS-Dokumentationszentrum (Munich)
