= Jawne =

- יבנה
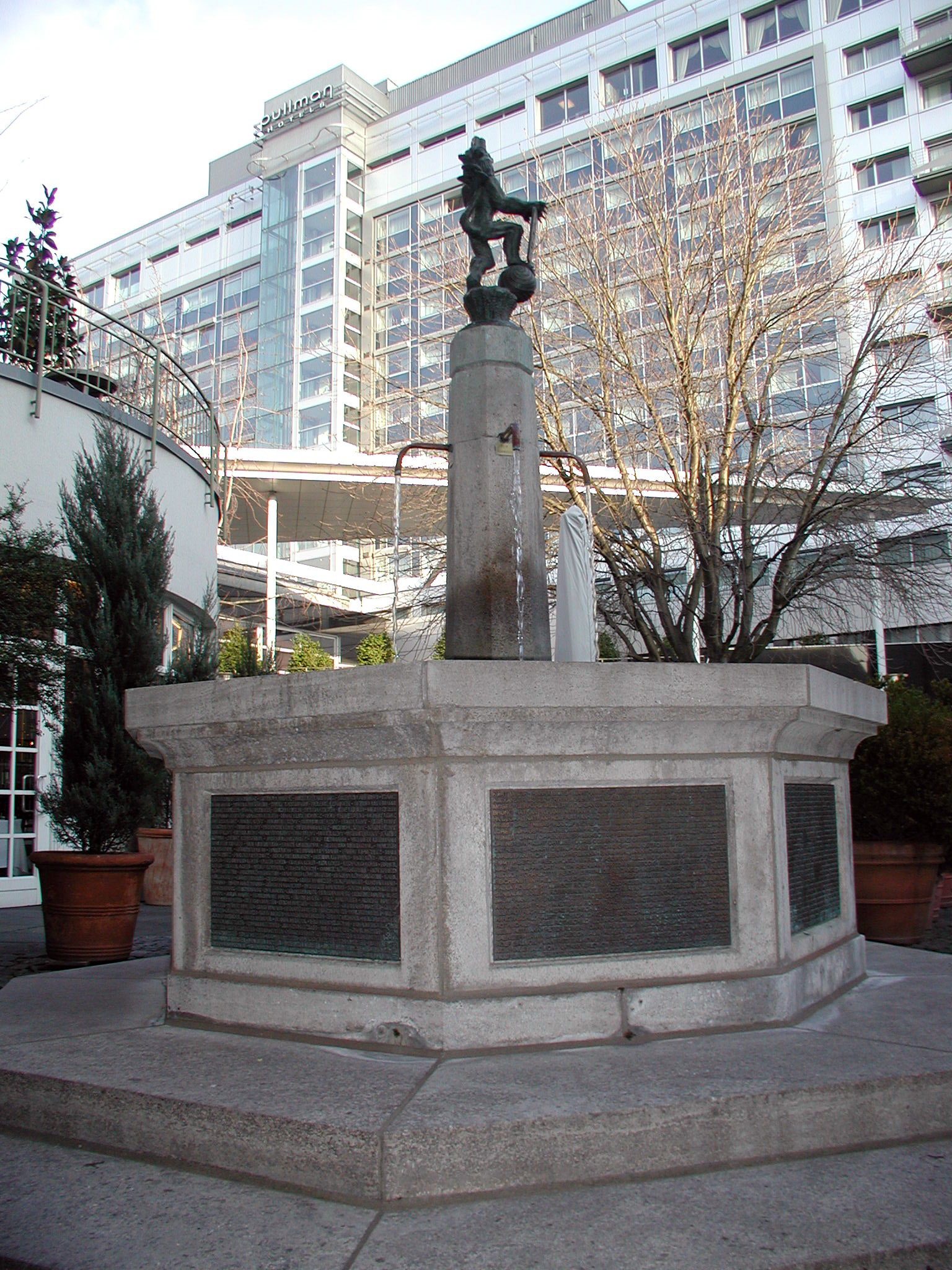
- The Löwenbrunnen (Lions' Fountain) at Erich Klibansky Platz is a memorial to the Jawne

Location
- Cologne; Germany; 50°56′23.55″N 6°56′41.36″E

Information
- Type: Reformrealgymnasium
- Established: 1919
- Founder: Rabbi Emanuel Carlebach
- Affiliation: Jewish

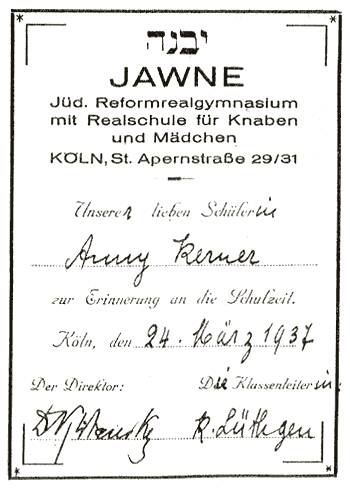
Certificate of attendance from Jawne, 1937

The Jawne (Hebrew: יבנה) was a Jewish Reformrealgymnasium (reform grammar school) in Cologne.

== Name ==
The school took its name from the town of Yavne near Tel Aviv, where the Jewish Supreme Court, the Sanhedrin, after the destruction of Jerusalem in 70 CE, tried to maintain the Jewish traditions with a school of Jewish law.

== History ==
The Jawne in Cologne was the first and only Jewish secondary school in the Rhineland. It was founded by Rabbi Emanuel Carlebach (1874–1927), brother of rabbi Ephraim Carlebach, of the congregation Adass Jeshurum around Easter 1919, was built in 1921 and was recognized by the state in 1925 as a Real-Progymnasium and Lizeum, with the rights of a semi-public institution. Rabbi Carlebach had founded in 1907 a private elementary school by the name of Moriah.

On September 28, 1929, its official name was changed to Privats Jüdisches Reform-Realgymnasium mit Realschule für Knaben und Mädchen. The Jawne school position was strengthened when, on April 27, 1928, it entered into an agreement with the executive board of the Cologne community whereby, for a period of five years, this school would receive an annual stipend. In return the school was to be administered by a board of governors, the majority of whom were appointed by the executive board of the Jewish community. Its teachers and directors had to be of conservative religious views. From April 9, 1929, its director was Dr. Erich Klibansky.

During the school year 1930–31 the pupils numbered 103 boys and 75 girls, during 1936–1937 the total number of students, boys and girls, was 410.

Klibanksy recognized the Nazi danger early. He reacted reinforcing the lessons in English and Modern Israeli Hebrew to prepare his students to a life outside of Germany. Already in 1933 he said without illusion: "To which school do I send my child? This question is decided today. One cannot answer that we should not take ourselves back into the ghetto, because the process of exclusion by the German people towards us Jews is in full swing."

Erich Klibansky and his teachers planned after 1938 to evacuate the whole school to the United Kingdom, and organized to this end the Kindertransport. The outward voyage by train and ship could be done only without the company of their parents. He thus succeeded to let a part of his students leave for England. At least 130 Jewish children from Cologne were able to survive.

After the breakout of the Second World War this was no longer possible. Klibansky, his family and the remaining students were deported in 1942 along with more than 1,000 other Cologne Jews to near Minsk and killed there without exception.

== Remembrance ==
In the Jawne Memorial and Educational Center, that is located in the area of the destroyed school, its history is remembered with exhibitions. A permanent exhibition "The children from the other schoolyard. The story of the Jawne 1919-1942" conceived by the historian Cordula Lissner opened in 2007. The area, thanks to the insistent efforts of citizens of Cologne, was named in 1990 Erich Klibansky Platz. In the small square is the Löwenbrunnen (Lions' Fountain) designed by the sculptor and surviving student of the school, Hermann Gurfinkel. The fountain serves as a memorial and lists the names of the children killed. In November 2008 the initiative was honored by the prize "Aktiv für Demokratie und Toleranz", in December 2009 by the Cologne Bilz-Prize of the Bilz-Foundation.

In 2009, the preservation of the memorial was threatened because the rooms used were no longer to be provided free of charge by the landlord, as was previously the case, but the association was to pay a "standard rent." Protests against this change were successful and at the beginning of 2010, an amicable settlement was reached, and the Jawne received a permanent guarantee of existence.

The memorial is run by a working group of about 20 members in conjunction with the EL-DE Haus. The Landschaftsverband Rheinland (Rhineland Regional Association) honored this commitment on September 10, 2013, it awarded its Rheinlandtaler Award to the two long-time Jawne employees Ursula Reuter and Adrian Stellmacher on behalf of the staff of the working group.
