= Erich Klibansky =

German teacher (1900–1942)

Erich Klibansky (28 November 1900 – 24 July 1942) was headmaster and teacher of Jawne, the first Jewish Gymnasium of Rhineland in Cologne.

== Life ==
Klibansky, who came from a family of rabbis originally located in Lithuania near Kaunas, was born in Frankfurt am Main. His father directed there a known interdenominational boarding school, which his son also attended. Afterwards Klibansky attended the Frankfurt Goethe-Gymnasium and studied History, German studies and Romance studies at university in Frankfurt am Main, Marburg and Munich. He graduated in Marburg in 1925 with a thesis on “The topographic changes of the Frankfurt archbishop’s authorities in Hesse“.

From his marriage with Meta David from Hamburg, he had three sons: Hans-Raphael, Alexander and Michael. In the spring of 1929 the family relocated to Cologne, where he purchased a spacious apartment in a house in Volksgartenstraße.

== Works ==
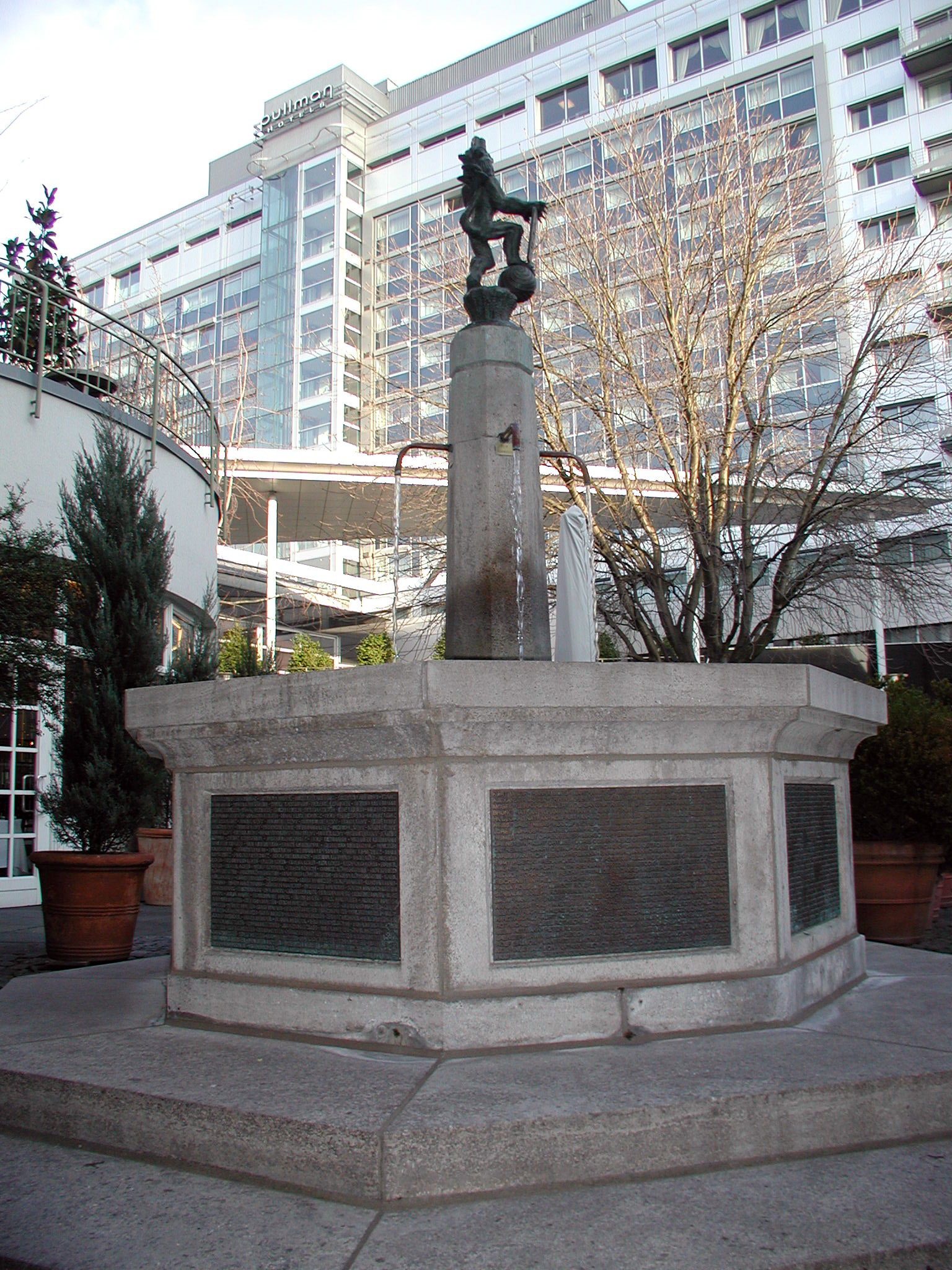
Lion fountain in Erich Klibansky Platz in Cologne

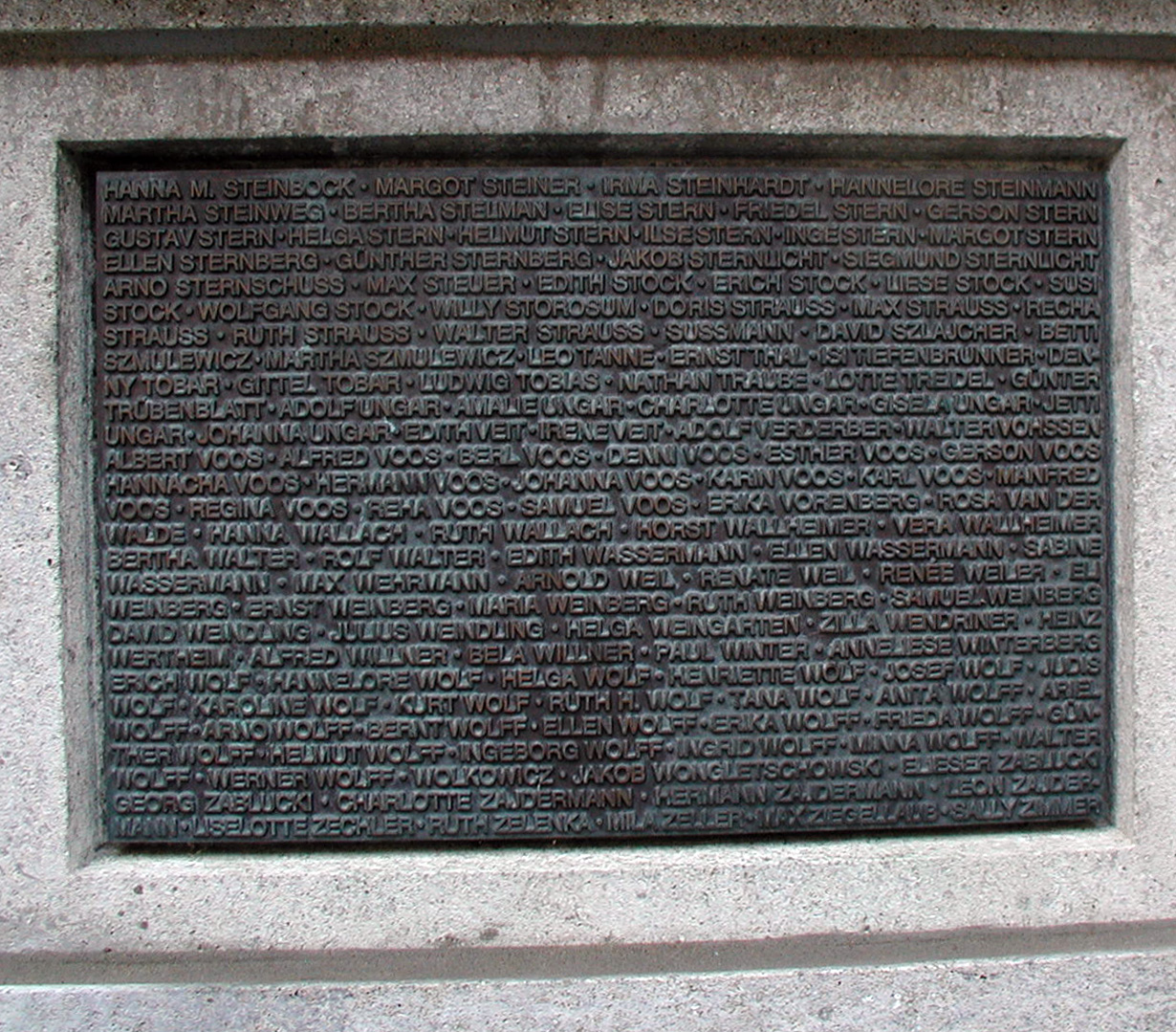
Lion fountain, memorial plaque

In the same year, as a probationary teacher, he became headmaster of the high school Jawne in Cologne, which had been created ten years before. Despite the hardships of the incipient economic crisis, Klibansky succeeded to assure the school's survival. As the school, being private, did not receive any subsidy, he raised funds for reconstruction and renovation, so that with the school fee of 400 marks the operation of the school was assured.

Under Klibansky the school got a continuously growing level of esteem from the whole Jewish population of Cologne. After the Nazis took power in Germany in 1933 and with the growing discrimination of the Jews of Cologne, Klibanksy did not have many illusions concerning his future in Germany.

=== The salvation of his "English classes" ===
As a consequence of the increasing pressure on the Jews the Klibansky family had to leave their apartment in Volksgartenstraße, and moved into narrow rooms in Kamekestraße at the end of 1937. During this period, Klibansky conceived a plan to use the good language knowledge of his "English Classes", that he prepared for the Cambridge Certificate of Proficiency, for an emigration to Britain.

With the approval of the Central Reich Office for Emigration he found in London support for his plan from important Jewish personalities. The Central British Council for Refugees arranged for the accommodation in a college for his students. Before the breakout of the war in 1939 he was able to send five classes with a total of 130 students to Britain; afterwards the borders were closed.

Kurt Marx, one of the rescued children of Jawne school, acknowledges Klibansky's achievement in an interview in 2020:

Straight after the pogrom our head teacher, Dr Erich Klibansky, started organising to get Jawne students on the Kindertransport to England. It was amazing that in a matter of weeks he managed to organise us all to leave, and to get our parents to do whatever they needed to prepare, to decide what to take and what not to take. By January we were gone.

== Assassination and tribute ==
Klibansky and his whole family were deported from Cologne in July 1942. During the transport to an unknown destination they were all shot in a wooded area near Blagowschtschin in the region of Minsk in a prepared pit.

In 1990 a square in Cologne, the Erich Klibansky Platz, was dedicated to him. Five Stolpersteine ("stumbling blocks") by artist Gunter Demnig commemorating Klibansky and his family are installed in front of their home in the Volksgartenstraße in Cologne.

== See also ==
- History of the Jews in Cologne
- Kindertransport

== Sources ==
- Adolf Kober, Cologne, The Jewish Publication Society of America, Philadelphia 1940, p. 271–272 available online
- Dieter Corbach, Die Jawne zu Köln: zur Geschichte des ersten jüdischen Gymnasiums im Rheinland und zum Gedächtnis an Erich Klibansky, 1900–1942. Scriba, Köln, 1990. ISBN 978-3-921232-42-2
- Kirsten Serup-Bilfeldt, Zwischen Dom und Davidstern, Jüdisches Leben in Köln. Verlag Kiepenheuer & Witsch, Köln, o.J. (2001) ISBN 978-3-462-03508-7
- Hans Thiel, "Erich Klibansky – Germanist und Direktor der Jawne (1900–1942)" in Diskussion Deutsch, 23 (1992) 127, p. 493–503, ISSN 0342-1589
