= Schink =

Schink is a surname. Notable people with the surname include:

- Barthel Schink (1927–1944), member of the Edelweiss Pirates
- Bernhard Schink, microbiologist having described the genus Pelobacter
