= Gertrud Koch =

German resistance fighter (1924–2016)

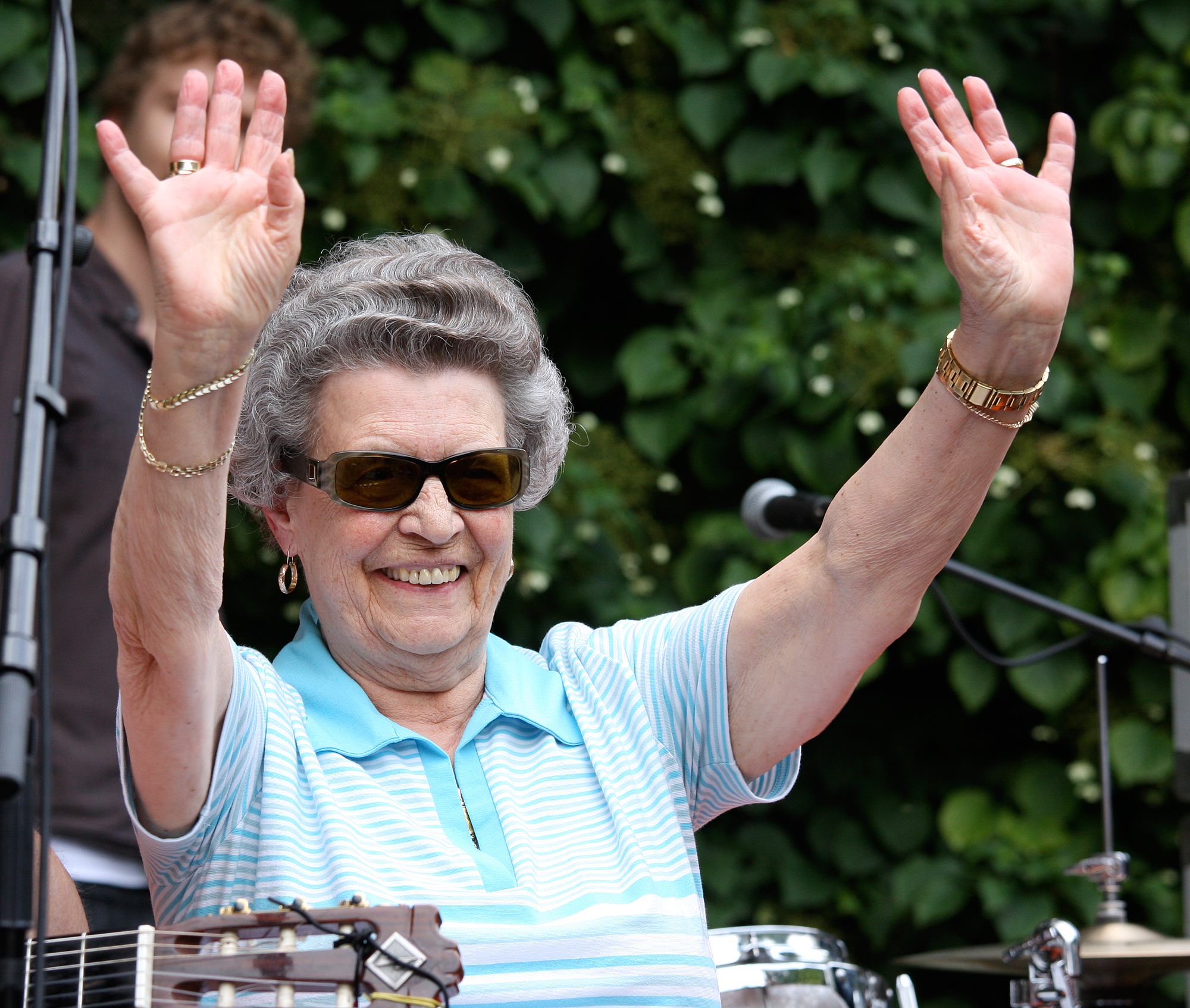
- Koch in 2009
- Born: 1 June 1924; Cologne, Germany
- Died: 21 June 2016 (aged 92); Cologne, Germany
- Other name: Mucki
- Known for: Resistance Fighting

Gertrud Koch (1 June 1924 – 21 June 2016) was a German resistance fighter during World War II. She is best known for being a member of the youth group Edelweiss Pirates.

== Life ==
She was born in Cologne on 1 June 1924. Her father was a communist and was arrested several times after 1933. He died in a concentration camp in 1942. Her mother lost her job and could not afford to send Koch to high school. Koch had an apprenticeship at a Montessori kindergarten but was unable to take her final exams due to her family's political affiliations.

Before the Nazi Party came into power, she was a member of the communist group Red Young Pioneers. She refused to join the League of German Girls and instead joined the Edelweiss Pirates. During her time in the group, she climbed Cologne's main train station to scatter anti-Nazi leaflets, hid people, broke into food stores, and wrote slogans on the walls of houses. Her cover name while in the group was "Mucki". She was arrested in December 1942 and interrogated by the Gestapo at Brauweiler. She was held there until May 1943. After she was released, she fled to Southern Germany with her mother where she worked on a farm and returned to Cologne after the war.

She first told her story publicly in 2000 at an exhibition about the Edelweiss Pirates at EL-DE Haus. She was awarded the Order of Merit of the Federal Republic of Germany in 2011. In 2005, she co-founded the yearly festival Edelweißpiratenfestival (Edelweiss Pirates Festival). She published her memoirs, Edelweiß - Meine Jugend als Widerstandskämpferin (Edelweiss - My youth as a resistance fighter) in 2006.

Koch was the last known surviving member of the Edelweiss Pirates and she died on 21 June 2016.
