= Fritz Theilen =

German resistance member (1927–2012)

Fritz Theilen in 1939

Fritz Theilen (27 September 1927 – 18 April 2012) was a German member of a anti-Nazi resistance group, the Edelweiss Pirates, during World War II.

Born to working-class parents, he joined the Deutsches Jungvolk division of the Hitler Youth in 1937 but was excluded for resisting orders in 1940. He started an apprenticeship at the local Ford Motor Company auto plant in 1941.

In 1942, he joined the Edelweiss Pirates. He was imprisoned at the Gestapo's Cologne headquarters, the EL-DE Haus, in 1943. After managing to escape from prison, he survived in the underground for the rest of the war.

Ford re-employed him only after the British occupation force had exerted pressure on the company's management.
