= Barthel Schink =

Nazi resister from Germany (1927–1944)

- Pronunciation: ˈbaʁtl̩ ˈʃɪŋk
- Born: 27 November 1927
- Died: 10 November 1944 (aged 16); Ehrenfeld, Cologne, Germany
- Cause of death: Execution (by Gestapo)
- Citizenship: Germany
- Organization: Edelweiss Pirates

Bartholomäus (Barthel) Schink (German: [ˈbaʁtl̩ ˈʃɪŋk]; November 27, 1927 – November 10, 1944) was a member of the Edelweiss Pirates, active in the Ehrenfeld Group (Ehrenfeld is a district of Cologne) in Cologne, which resisted the Nazi regime. He was among the 13 people who were publicly hanged in Cologne by the Gestapo on 10 November 1944, on special orders from Gestapo leader Heinrich Himmler. Although they were not tried, the group was accused of killing five people and planning an attack on the EL-DE Haus, the local Gestapo headquarters.

The street where Schink was hanged, next to the Ehrenfeld railway station in the Ehrenfeld suburb of Cologne, used to be called the Hüttenstraße, until it was renamed after Schink in 1991. Yad Vashem recognized Barthel Schink as Righteous Among the Nations for risking his life to hide Jews from the Nazi persecution. There is a memorial plaque honoring the memory of all those killed from the Edelweiss Pirates and the Ehrenfeld Group.

== Biography ==
Schink had four siblings. His father worked as a post office worker in Cologne. Prior to his involvement with the Edelweiss Pirates, he was training to become a roofer.

He was part of the Hitler Youth, but he was not sympathetic to the Nazis and joined the Edelweiss Pirates, where he became friends with fellow Pirate Jean Jülich. He and his friend Günther Schwarz joined with a group that stole goods, including weapons and explosives, and periodically shot at local Gestapo leaders. Schink and Schwarz were eventually caught by the Nazis. They were severely mistreated while in custody, and ultimately were executed on 10 November 1944.

== Gallery ==
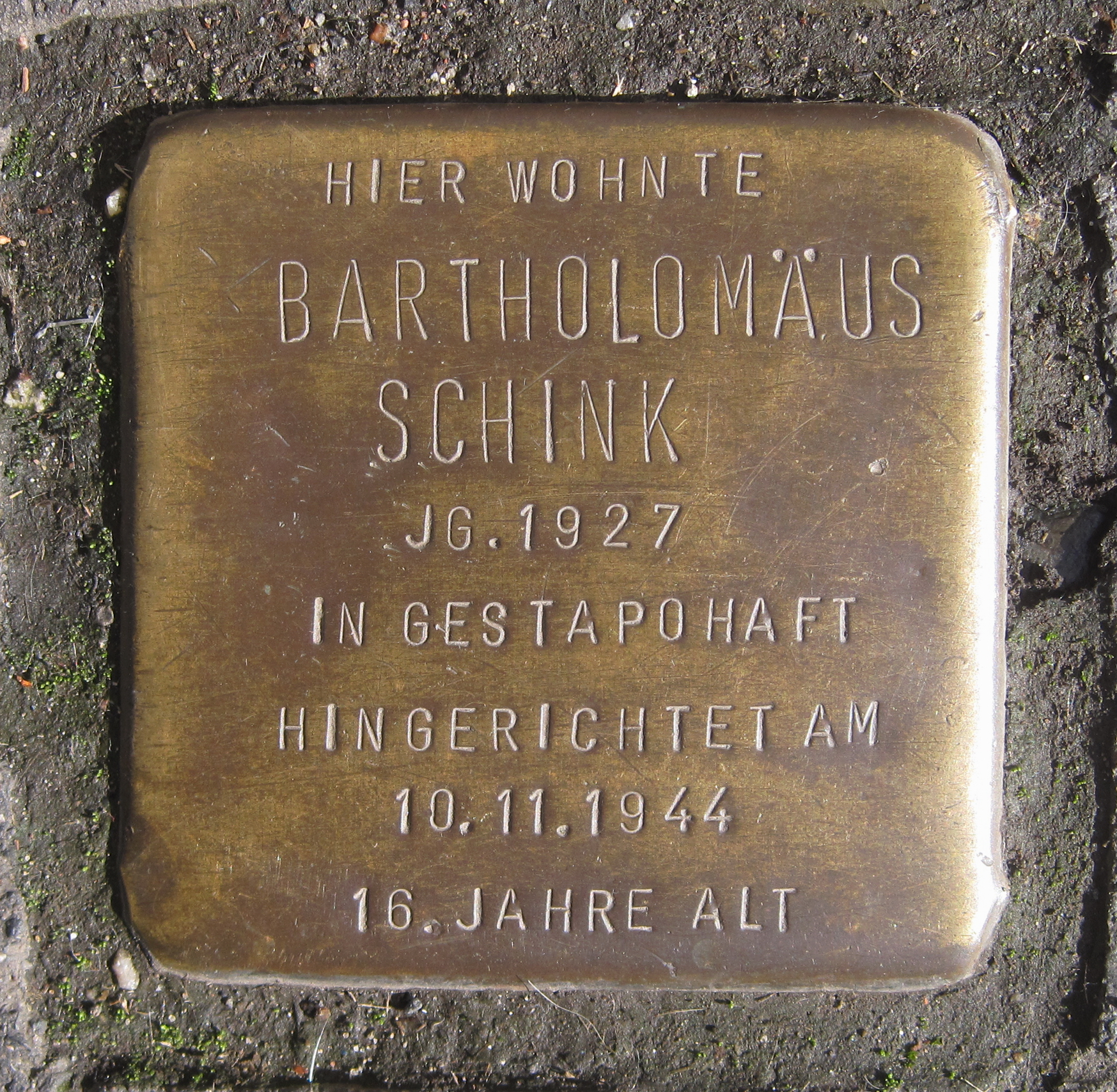
Stolperstein in memory of Schink. Translation: "Here lived Bartholomäus Schink, born 1927, executed by the Gestapo on 10 November 1944, at the age of 16."

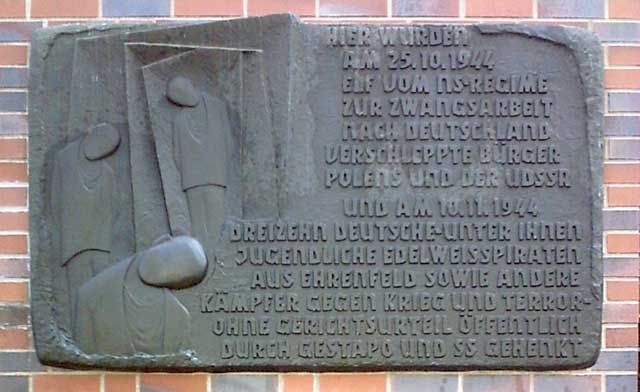
Memorial plaque to Edelweiss Pirates and Ehrenfeld Group members

== See also ==
- List of Germans who resisted Nazism
