= Edelweiss Pirates =

Loosely organized group of youth in Nazi Germany

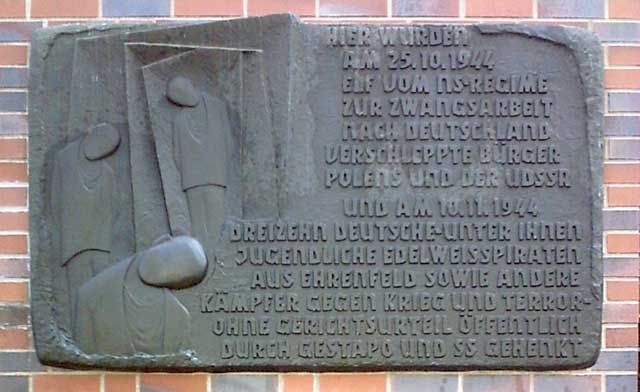
Memorial for the Cologne victims on Schönsteinstraße, next to the Köln-Ehrenfeld station

The Edelweiss Pirates (German: Edelweißpiraten [ˈeːdl̩vaɪs.piˌʁaːtn̩]) were a loosely organized group of youths opposed to the status quo of Nazi Germany. They emerged in western Germany out of the German Youth Movement of the late 1930s in response to the strict regimentation of the Hitler Youth. Similar in many ways to the Leipzig Meuten, they consisted of young people, mainly between the ages of 14 and 17, who had evaded the Hitler Youth by leaving school (which was allowed at 14) and were also young enough to avoid military conscription, which was only compulsory from the age of 17. The roots and background of the Edelweiss Pirates movement were detailed in the 2004 film Edelweiss Pirates, directed by Niko von Glasow.

== Name ==
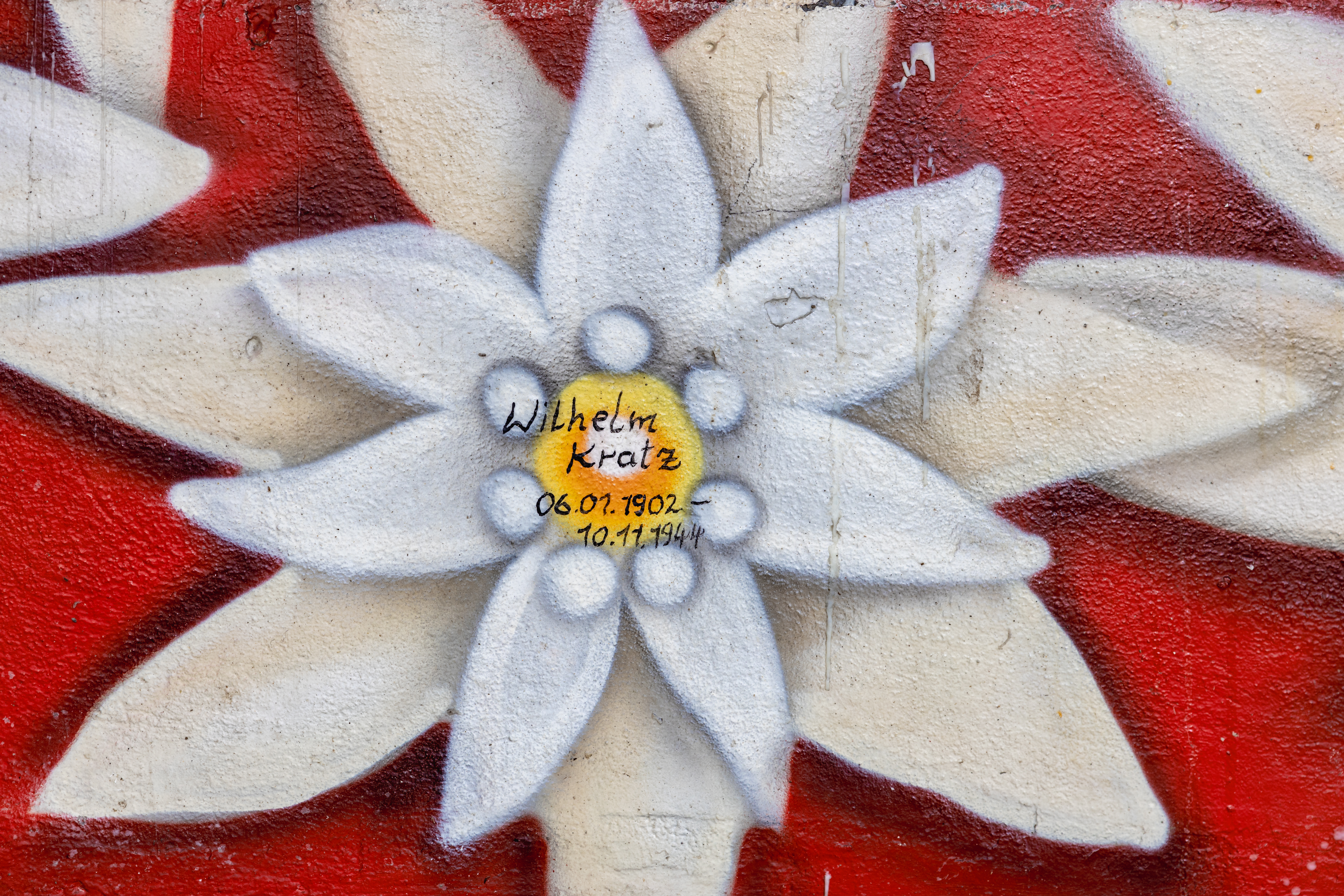
Edelweiss flower; detail from a mural in Cologne memorializing the Edelweiss Pirates

The Edelweiss Pirates were named after the edelweiss flower, which grows wild in the Alps mountain range. An early adopter of the name was a small social group which included Gertrud Koch, and ultimately grew to become one of the Pirate groups.

== History ==
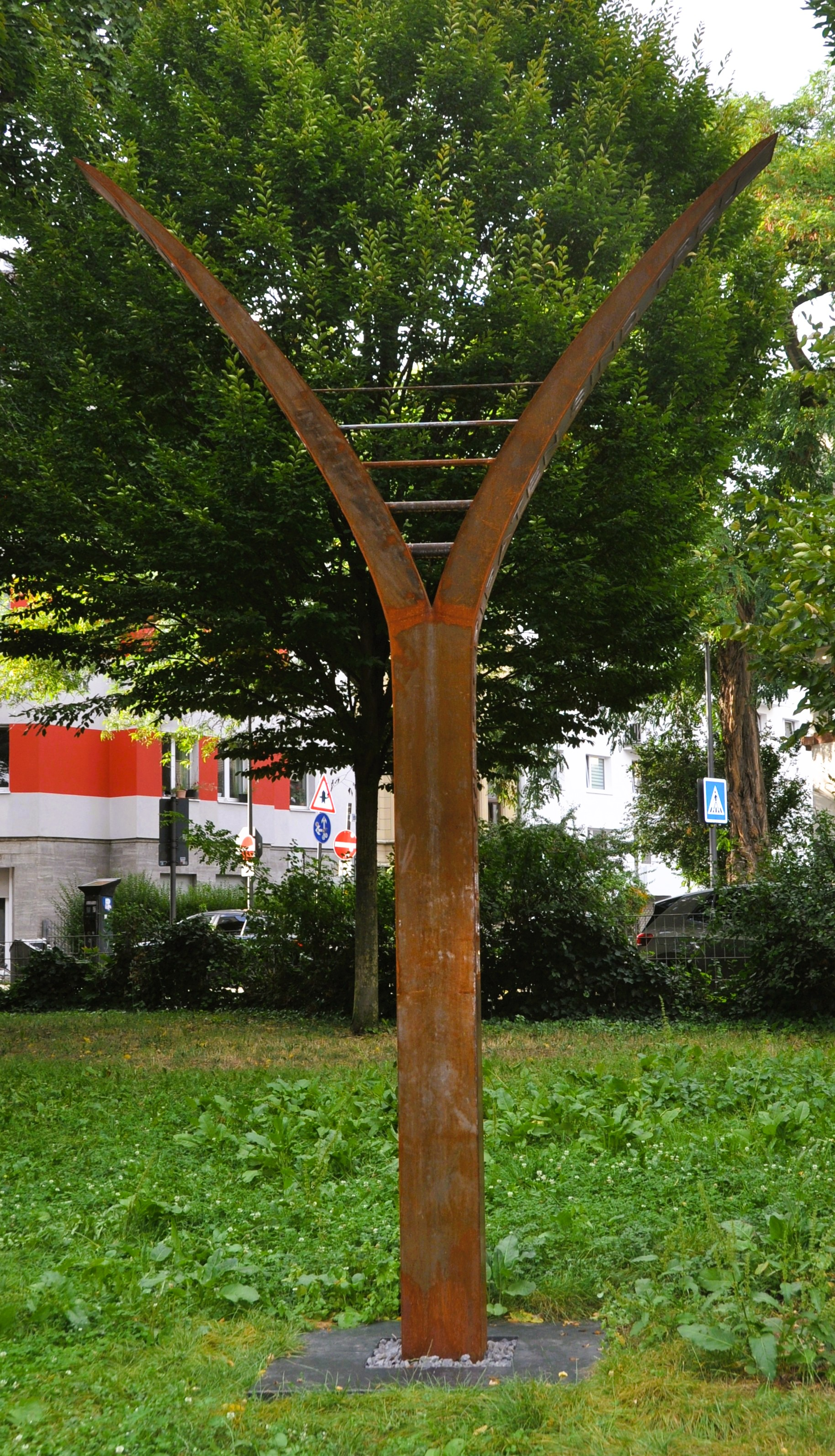
Monument to the Nippes Edelweiss Pirates, Leipziger Platz, 2025

=== Early years ===
The origins of the Edelweißpiraten were before the Second World War, as the state-controlled Hitler Youth (German: Hitlerjugend) was mobilized to indoctrinate young people, at the expense of the leisure activities previously offered to them. This tension was exacerbated once the war began and youth leaders were conscripted. The Edelweißpiraten offered young people considerable freedom to express themselves and to mingle with members of the opposite sex. This was unlike Nazi youth movements, which were strictly segregated by sex, the Hitler Youth being for boys and the League of German Girls (German: Bund Deutscher Mädel) for girls. Although predominantly male, the Edelweißpiraten consisted of male and female members. They used many symbols of the outlawed German Youth Movement, including their tent (the Kohte), their style of clothing (the Jungenschaftsjacke), and their songs.

The first Edelweißpiraten appeared in the late 1930s in western Germany, comprising mostly young people between 14 and 18. Individual groups were closely associated with different regions but were identifiable by a common style of dress with their own edelweiss badge and by their opposition to what they saw as the paramilitary nature of the Hitler Youth. Subgroups of the Edelweißpiraten included the Navajos, (Note: The Navajos were named after the Navajo people.) centered on Cologne, especially the Ehrenfeld area; the Kittelbach Pirates of Oberhausen and Düsseldorf; and the Roving Dudes of Essen. According to one Nazi official in 1941, "Every child knows who the Kittelbach Pirates are. They are everywhere; there are more of them than there are Hitler Youth... They beat up the patrols... They never take no for an answer."

Although they rejected the Nazis' authoritarianism, the Edelweißpiraten's nonconformist behaviour tended to be restricted to petty provocations. Despite this, they represented a group of youth who rebelled against the government's regimentation of leisure and were unimpressed by the propaganda touting Volksgemeinschaft (people's community). During the war, many Edelweißpiraten supported the Allies and assisted deserters from the German Army. Some groups also collected propaganda leaflets dropped by Allied aircraft and pushed them through letterboxes.

Apart from gatherings on streets, they engaged in hiking and camping trips, defying the restrictions on free movement, which kept them away from the prying eyes of the totalitarian regime. They were highly antagonistic to the Hitler Youth, ambushing their patrols and taking great pride in beating them up. One of their slogans was "Eternal War on the Hitler Youth". As one subgroup, the Navajos, sang

Des Hitlers Zwang, der macht uns klein,
noch liegen wir in Ketten
Doch einmal werden wir wieder frei,
wir werden die Ketten schon brechen.
Denn unsere Fäuste, die sind hart,
ja – und die Messer sitzen los,
für die Freiheit der Jugend,
kämpfen Navajos.

Translation:

The force of Hitler makes us small;
we still lie in chains.
But one day we will be free again;
we are about to break the chains.
For our fists, they are hard;
yes – and the knives sit ready;
for the freedom of the youth
Navajos fight.

=== Nazi reprisals ===
The Nazi response to the Edelweißpiraten was relatively slight before the war, because they were viewed as a minor irritant and did not fit in with the policy of selective terror. As the war went on, and some Pirates' activities became more extreme, so did the punishments meted out. Individuals identified by the Gestapo as belonging to the various gangs were often rounded up and released with their heads shaved to shame them. In some cases, young people were sent to concentration camps specifically organized for youths, or temporarily detained in regular prison.

On 25 October 1944, Heinrich Himmler ordered a crackdown on the group, and in November of that year, a group of thirteen people, the heads of the Ehrenfelder Gruppe, were publicly hanged in Cologne. This followed an attack on an arms depot during which members of the Edelweißpiraten shot and killed the local Gestapo chief. Some of those hanged were former Edelweißpiraten. The hanged included six teenagers, among them Bartholomäus Schink, called "Barthel", former member of the local Navajos. Fritz Theilen survived.

State repression never managed to break the spirit of most groups, which constituted a subculture that rejected the norms of Nazi society.

While the Edelweißpiraten assisted army deserters and others hiding from the Third Reich, they have yet to receive recognition as a resistance movement. That is partly because they were viewed with contempt by many of their former Youth Movement comrades due to the "proletarian" backgrounds and "criminal" activities. The families of members killed by the Nazis have as yet received no reparations.

=== Post-World War II ===
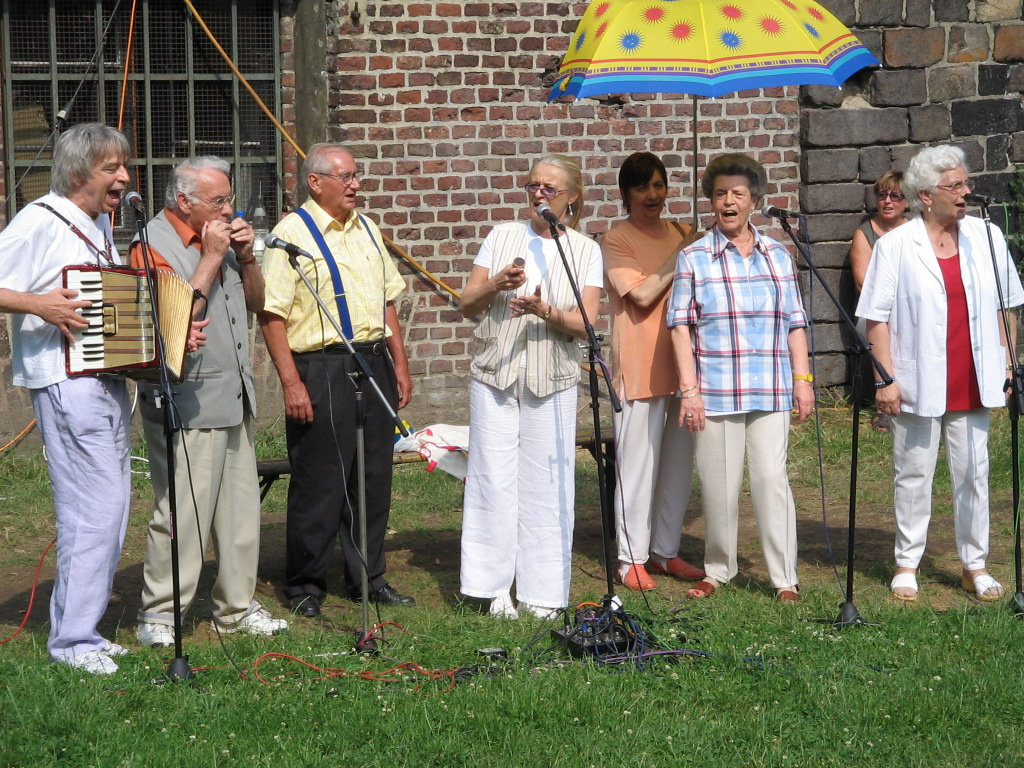
Edelweiss Pirates during the "Edelweißpiratenfestival" in Cologne, 2005

Contrary to what the Allies had hoped, the Edelweißpiraten were neither pro-British nor pro-American. In the early days of the Allied occupation, they sought contact with the occupying authority to intervene on behalf of friends, and even to propose that they might go on patrol, as did the Wuppertal Edelweißpiraten. They were taken seriously and courted by various factions; the first known pamphlets of the Communist Party of Germany (KPD), in July 1945, were directed at them.

While a small number of Edelweißpiraten remained in the Antifascist Youth and the Free German Youth organizations, the majority turned their backs on these bodies as soon as they realized that, in the words of one member, "politics were taking centre stage again". For example, a group in Bergisch Gladbach disbanded when young people of communist orientation tried to form a majority in the group.

The Edelweißpiraten's turning away from the re-authorized political youth groups forced them into the role of social outcasts and brought them into conflict with the Allies. The headquarters of the American Counter-Intelligence Corps in Frankfurt reported in May 1946 that Edelweiß activities were known throughout the British and American Zones. At about this time, Allied intelligence officers launched Operation Valentine, a counter-insurgency dragnet to arrest hundreds of Edelweiss leaders and the decapitation of many local groups, known as Züge.

Groups identifying themselves as Edelweißpiraten conducted many violent attacks against Soviet Russian and Polish displaced persons. Author Peter Schult witnessed such an attack against a Polish black marketeer. There were also attacks against German women who were known to have been friends or been intimate with British soldiers.

In a trial held by a military court at Uelzen in April 1946, a juvenile named as "Heinz D." was initially sentenced to death, for his "very active part in carrying out the nefarious schemes of the Piraten. An organization such as this might well threaten the peace of Europe." The sentence was commuted the following month to a prison term. In Western Germany, Piraten continued to be considered criminals–and former members were not exonorated of resistance-related crimes, which impacted their criminal records–until the 2000s. At that time, former Pirate Gertrud "Mucki" Koch said, "We were from the working classes, that is the main reason why we have only now been recognised. After the war there were no judges in Germany so the old Nazi judges were used and they upheld the criminalisation of what we did and who we were."

Controversy surrounded the claims that the group were Widerstandskämpfer (resistance fighters) after one member, Fritz Theilen, published his memoirs in 1984, leading to several legal battles that Theilen won. Yad Vashem in Israel recognised the Piraten as "righteous gentiles" in 1988. In April 2011, Cologne's mayor, Jürgen Roters, presented Theilen, Koch, and three other survivors with the Order of Merit of the Federal Republic of Germany.

== List of Edelweiss Pirates ==
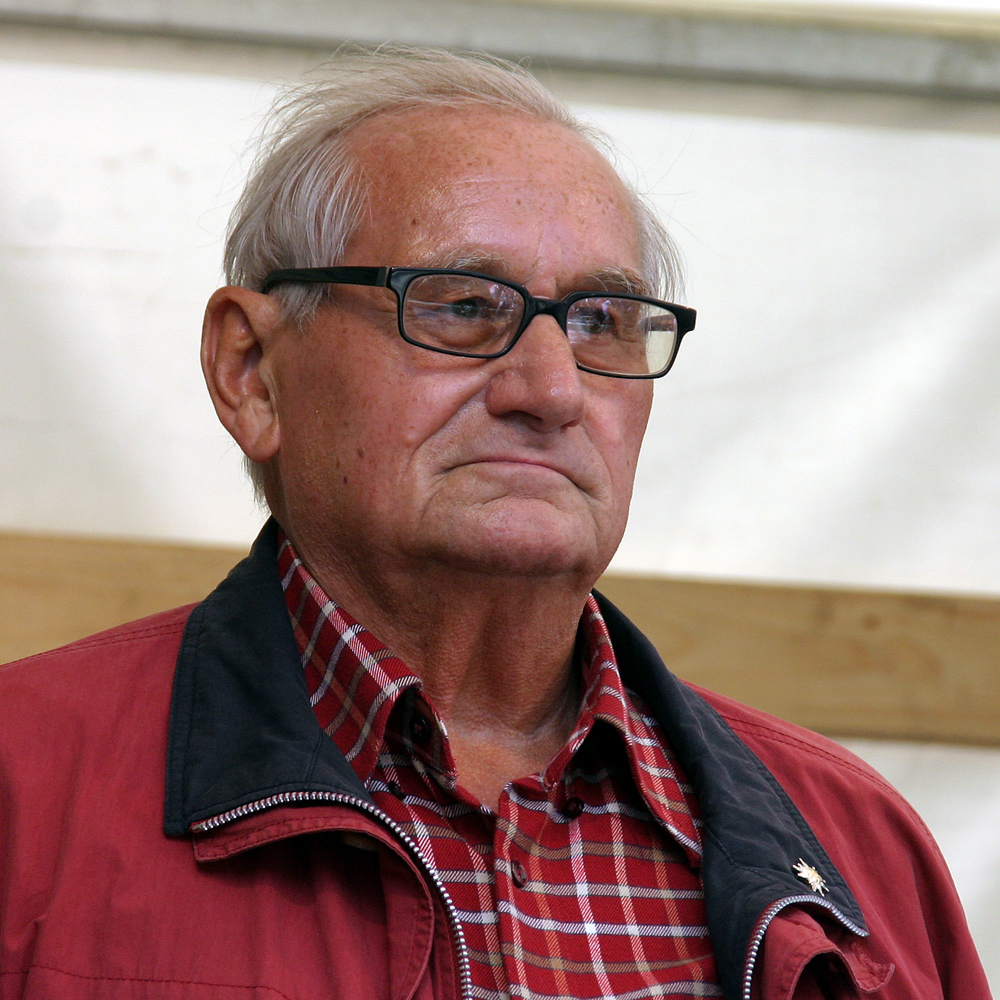
Jean Jülich in 2007

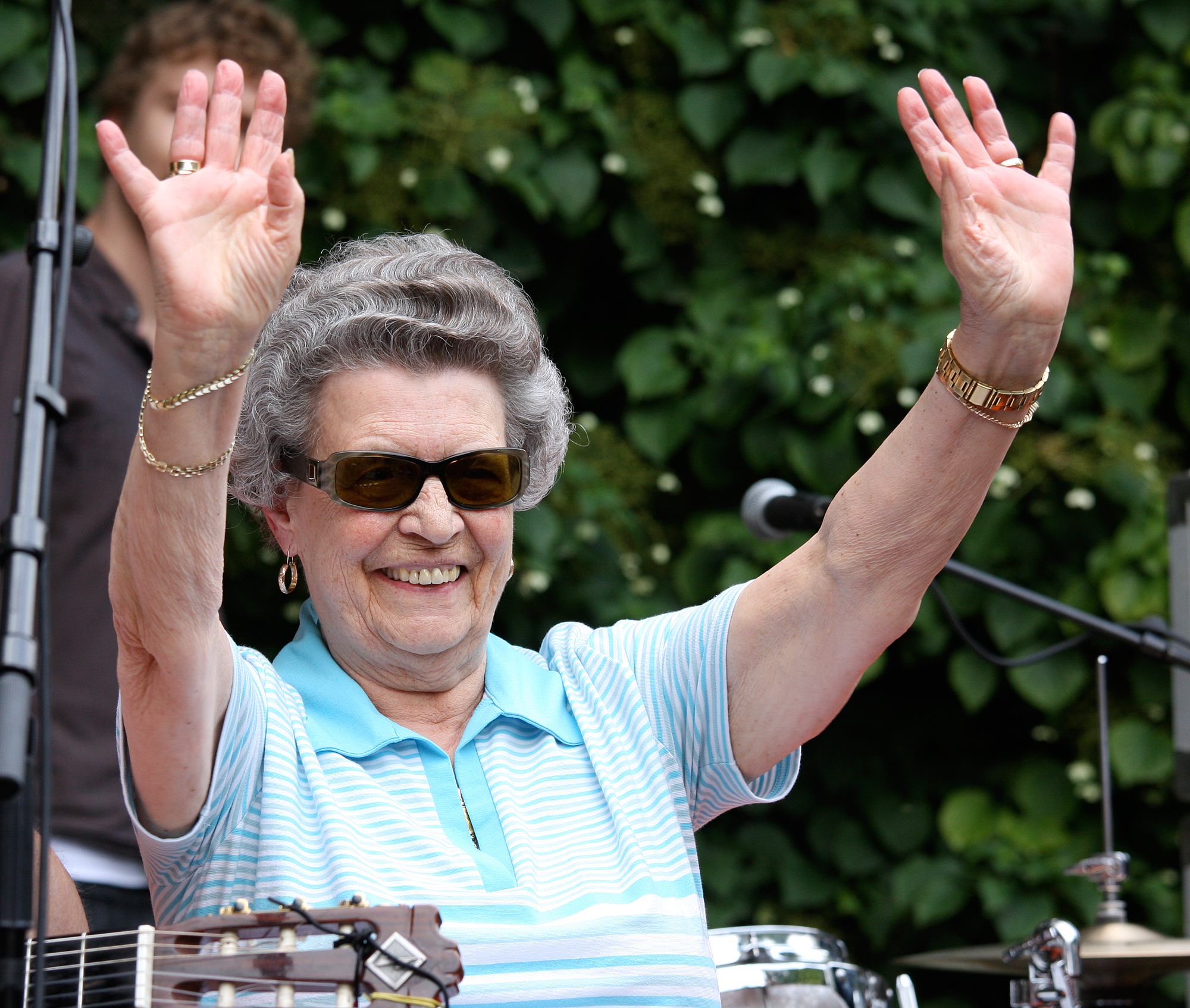
Gertrud Koch in 2009

- Jean Jülich (1929–2011)
- Gertrud "Mucki" Koch (1924–2016)
- Kurt Piehl
- Barthel Schink (1927–1944)
- Fritz Theilen (1927–2012)

== See also ==
- Hippie
- Juvenile delinquency
- List of Germans who resisted Nazism
- Socialist Youth of Germany – The Falcons
- Socialist Youth League Karl Liebknecht
- Swingjugend
- White Rose
- Youth activism
- Youth International Party
- Youth rights
