= NS Documentation Centre of the City of Cologne =

NS Documentation Centre - Cologne

NS-DOC logo

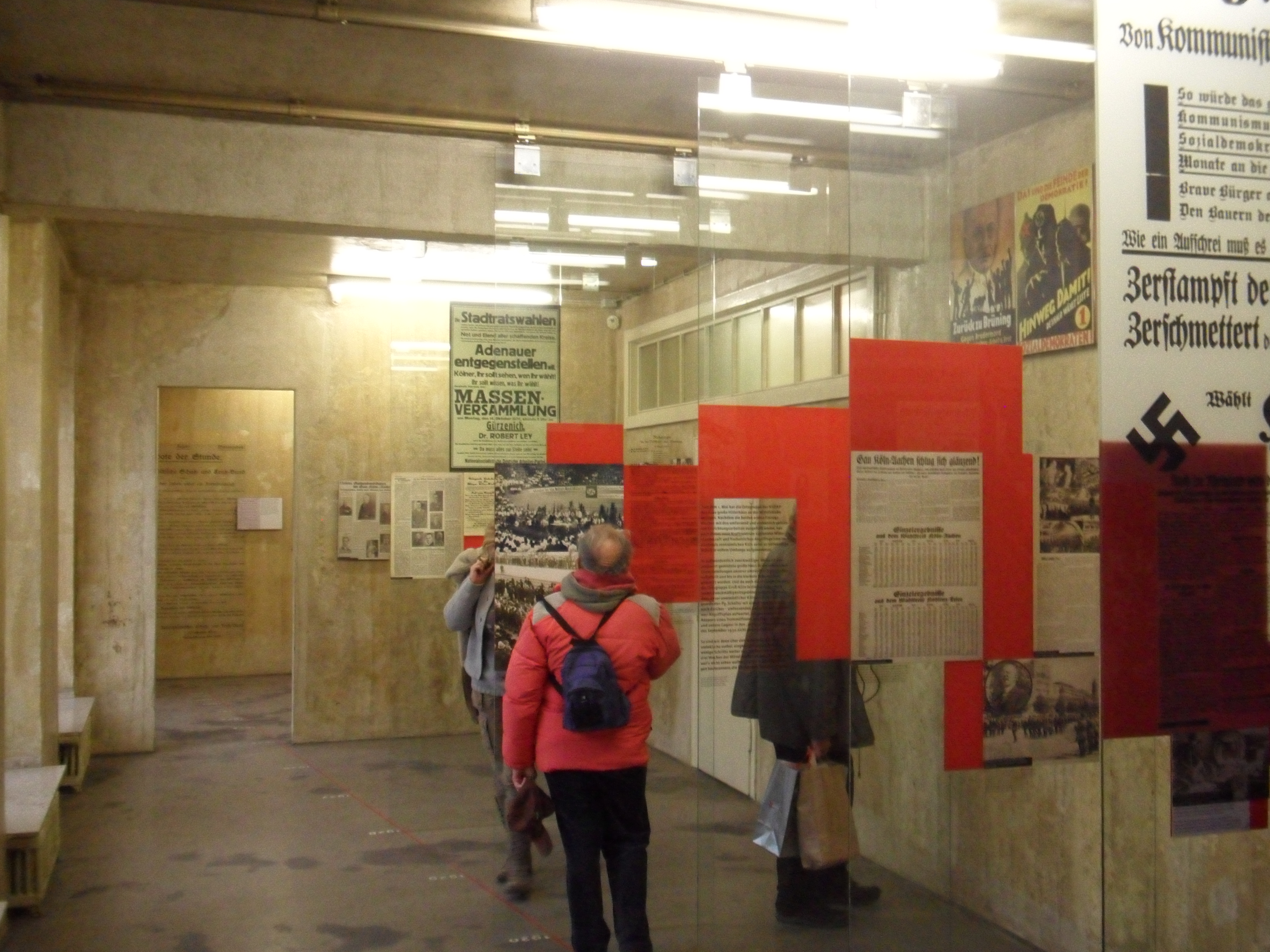
The permanent exhibition

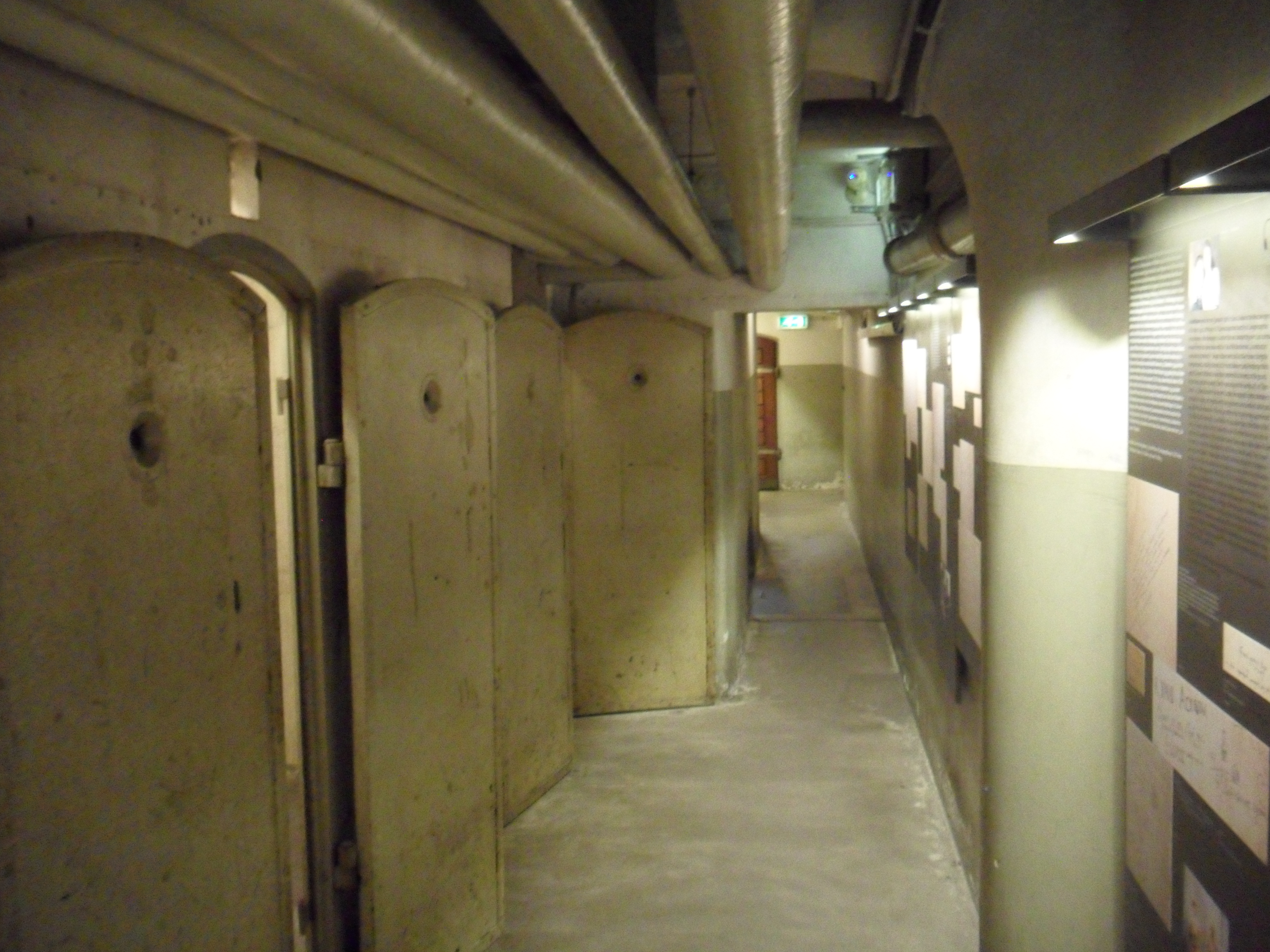
Cellblocks in the cellar

The NS Documentation Centre of the City of Cologne (German: NS-Dokumentationszentrum der Stadt Köln) was founded by a resolution passed by the Cologne City Council on December 13, 1979, and has become the largest regional memorial site in all of Germany for the victims of the Nazis. Since 1988, it has been housed in "EL-DE Haus," the EL-DE building, named for the initials of its owner, Catholic businessman Leopold Dahmen. This building was the headquarters of the Cologne Gestapo (secret police) between December 1935 and March 1945. In the final months of the war, several hundred people, most of them foreign forced laborers, were murdered in the courtyard of the building. In a bit of historical irony, the EL-DE building remained largely untouched by the ravages of the war.

The NS Documentation Centre (NS-DOC) is dedicated to memorializing the victims of the Nazi regime, as well as research and teaching about Cologne's history during the Nazi era. The former Gestapo prison was inaugurated as a memorial site on December 4, 1981. Some 1,800 inscriptions and drawings done by prisoners have survived on the walls of the ten cells. The Gestapo prison memorial site is one of the best preserved prisons from the Nazi era, representing a historical asset of national and European importance.

Since June 1997, the permanent exhibition in the EL-DE building has depicted political, social and community life in "Cologne During the Nazi Era." That includes the seizure of power and the power apparatus, propaganda and the "national community," everyday life, youth culture, religion, racism, the genocide of Cologne's Jews and its Sinti and Roma, and opposition, resistance, war and society during war. In addition, temporary exhibitions depict local and national aspects of the Nazi regime. The centre also mounts more than 130 events each year. The museum's educational department and the Information and Education Centre against Right-wing Extremism (ibs) also run educational and teaching programs.

The NS Documentation Centre views itself as an important research locus. This is supported by the library, with literature on Cologne under the Nazis, general Nazi history and right-wing extremism. It is also the task of the documentation department, with its extensive collections of photographs, posters, artifacts, documents and witness statements, which are organized into databases and made accessible. Numerous research projects deal with, among other subjects, Jewish history, contemporary witness statements and interviews, forced labor, the police, youth culture, the press, clubs and organizations, various victim groups and commemorative activities, such as the project of the Cologne artist Gunter Demnig's "Stolpersteinee" (Stumbling Blocks). Among the large, ongoing research undertakings are the history of the Holocaust, resistance, the Gestapo, the Nazi system of Gauleiter (district overseers), urban planning, public health policies, and the Hitler Youth movement. The results of the research projects are published in a series of writings in book form, a workbook series, a series put out by the Information and Education Association, and the centre's Internet page.

The NS Documentation Centre is a municipal institution and has been, since 2008, part of Cologne's city museums associations. Within the municipal administration, it is responsible for dealing with all subjects related to the city's Nazi past, including the visitor programs for former forced labourers, which the city has run since 1989. The centre has been the recipient of numerous awards, including the "special recommendation" of the 2000 Museum of the Year Award.

== Awards ==
The NS Documentation Centrehas been awarded several times:

- European Museum of the Year Award 2000 (special appreciation)
- Cologne Architecture Prize (German: Kölner Architekturpreis) 2001
- North Rhine-Westphalia Architecture prize (German: NRW-Architekturpreis) 2001
- Invitation to the Congress in Dubrovnik: "The Best in Heritage. An Annual Presentation of the Best Museum and Heritage Projects" 2002
- Andrea Riccardi Prize 2004
- History Award 2006 of History Channel for the research project "Navajos and Edelweiss Pirates - Non-conformist Youth behavior in Cologne 1933 to 1945" (German: Von Navajos und Edelweißpiraten – Unangepasstes Jugendverhalten in Köln 1933–1945)
- Prize for Innovation in Adult Education (German: Preis für Innovation in der Erwachsenenbildung) 2007 of the German Institute for Adult Education
- Freya Stephan Kühn Prize 2008 of the Association of History Teachers in North Rhine-Westphalia (German: Landesverband nordrhein-westfälischer Geschichtslehrer)

In 2004, Elzbieta Adamski, an employee of the NS Documentation Centre, received personally from Polish President Aleksander Kwaśniewski the Order of Merit of the Republic of Poland, one of the most valuable awards of the Polish government, "for her extraordinary merits in the field of the development of German-Polish relations". For more than ten years, she has been in charge of the visitor program for former forced labourers.

== Special exhibitions (selection) ==
- November 1988 to January 1989: Fate of the Jews in Cologne, 1918–1945
- November 2002 to February 2003: Special Feature: Negroe. Black people in NS state
- Mai 2003 to November 2003: Pictures of a Foreign Town. Forced Labour in Cologne, 1929–1945
- November 2003 to January 2004: Hans Calmeyer and saving Jews in the Netherlands
- August to September 2004: Oneg Schabbat. The Untergrund archive of the Warsaw Ghetto - Ringelblum archives. In cooperation with the Cologne branch of the Confederation of German Trade Unions, the Synagogue community and the Cologne branch of the Society for German Jewish collaboration
- September to November 2004: The Memory of Places. A Picture Project by Sabine Würich
- Mai to November 2005: Between the Frontlines. Cologne War Experiences, 1939–1945
- Mai to September 2006: The "Lischka-Trial". Three NS Perpetrators on Trial in Cologne
- Januar to August 2008: "Willkommen, Bienvenue, Welcome...". Political Revue - Cabaret - Varieté in Cologne, 1928–1938
- November 2008 to January 2009: Life of the Jews in Cologne, 1918–1945
- November 2009 to January 2010: Holy Night as if. Christmas in Political Propaganda. In collaboration with "Collection Christmas - Rita Breuer".
- Mai to September 2010: Cologne and its Jewish Architects. In collaboration with Wolfram Hagspiel
- November 2011 to March 2011: Kölle Alaaf (Cologne carnival cry) below the Swastika

== Publications ==
=== Volumes of the series of publications ===
- Barbara Becker-Jákli, Horst Matzerath, Harald Buhlan: Versteckte Vergangenheit. Über den Umgang mit der NS-Zeit in Köln. Aufsätze und Essays. (=Schriften des NS-Dokumentationszentrums der Stadt Köln, vol. 1), Emons Verlag, Köln 1994, ISBN 3-9244-9151-8.
- Thomas Deres, Martin Rüther (eds): Fotografieren verboten! Heimliche Aufnahmen von der Zerstörung Kölns. (=Schriften des NS-Dokumentationszentrums der Stadt Köln vol. 2). Emons Verlag, Köln 1995. ISBN 3-924491-55-0.
- Karola Fings: Messelager Köln. Ein KZ-Außenlager im Zentrum der Stadt. (=Schriften des NS-Dokumentationszentrums der Stadt Köln, vol. 3). Emons-Verlag Köln 1996. ISBN 392449178X
- Karin Dördelmann: Die Macht der Worte. Denunziationen im nationalsozialistischen Köln. (=Schriften des NS-Dokumentationszentrums der Stadt Köln, vol. 4). Emons Verlag, Köln 1997. ISBN 3-924491-15-1.
- Hiltrud Kier, Karen Lieserfeld, Horst Matzerath (eds.): Architektur der 30er/40er Jahre in Köln. Materialien zur Baugeschichte im Nationalsozialismus. (=Schriften des NS-Dokumentationszentrums der Stadt Köln, vol. 5). Emons Verlag. Köln 1998. ISBN 3-89705-103-6
- Michael Buddrus, Katja Klee, Gerhard Kock, Martin Rüther: Zu Hause könnten sie es nicht schöner haben!. Kinderlandverschickung aus Köln und Umgebung 1941-1945. (=Schriften des NS-Dokumentationszentrums der Stadt Köln, vol. 6). Emons Verlag. Köln 2000. ISBN 3-89705-174-5.
- Harald Buhlan, Werner Jung (eds.): Wessen Freund und wessen Helfer? Die Kölner Polizei im Nationalsozialismus. (=Schriften des NS-Dokumentationszentrums der Stadt Köln, vol. 7). Emons Verlag. Köln 2000. ISBN 3-89705-200-8.
- Barbara Becker-Jákli, Werner Jung, Martin Rüther: Nationalsozialismus und Regionalgeschichte. Festschrift für Horst Matzerath. (=Schriften des NS-Dokumentationszentrums der Stadt Köln, vol. 8), Emons Verlag, Köln 2002, ISBN 3-89705-255-5.
- Jürgen Müller: Ausgrenzung der Homosexuellen aus der »Volksgemeinschaft«. Die Ver-folgung von Homosexuellen in Köln 1933-1945. (=Schriften des NS-Dokumentationszentrums der Stadt Köln, vol. 9). Emons Verlag. Köln 2003. ISBN 3-89705-275-X.
- Britta Bopf: »Arisierung» in Köln. Die wirtschaftliche Existenzvernichtung der Juden 1933-1945. (=Schriften des NS-Dokumentationszentrums der Stadt Köln, vol. 10). Emons Verlag. Köln 2004. ISBN 3-89705-311-X.
- Barbara Becker-Jákli: Das jüdische Krankenhaus in Köln. Die Geschichte des Israeliti-schen Asyls für Kranke und Altersschwache 1869–1945. (=Schriften des NS-Dokumentationszentrums der Stadt Köln, vol. 11), Emons Verlag, Köln 2004, ISBN 3-89705-350-0.
- Martin Rüther: Köln im Zweiten Weltkrieg Alltag und Erfahrungen zwischen 1939 und 1945. Mit Beiträgen von Gebhard Aders (=Schriften des NS-Dokumentationszentrums der Stadt Köln, vol. 12). Emons Verlag. Köln 2005. ISBN 978-3-89705-407-3
- Karola Fings, Frank Sparing: Rassismus, Lager, Völkermord Die national-sozialistische Zigeunerverfolgung in Köln (=Schriften des NS-Dokumentationszentrums der Stadt Köln, vol. 13). Emons Verlag. Köln 2006. ISBN 978-3-89705-408-0
- Jürgen Müller: »Willkommen, Bienvenue, Welcome...» Politische Revue-Kabarett-Varieté in Köln 1928-1938 (=Schriften des NS-Dokumentationszentrums der Stadt Köln, vol. 14). Emons Verlag. Köln 2008. ISBN 978-3-89705-549-0

=== Individual publications (selection) ===
- Gabriele Rogmann, Horst Matzerath (eds.): Gedenkbuch. Die jüdischen Opfer des Nationalsozialismus aus Köln (Mitteilungen aus dem Stadtarchiv von Köln. 77. Heft. Böhlau Verlag. Köln) 1995. ISBN 3-412-12694-2.
- Köln im Nationalsozialismus Ein Kurzführer durch das EL-DE-Haus. Köln 2011. ISBN 978-3-89705-209-3 (English Version)
- Barbara Becker-Jákli: Das jüdische Köln. Geschichte und Gegenwart. Ein Stadtführer. Emons Verlag, Köln 2012, ISBN 978-3-89705-873-6.

== See also ==
- NS-Dokumentationszentrum (Munich)
