= Leipzig Meuten =

Anti-Nazi youths based in Leipzig

The Leipzig Meuten (German pronunciation: [ˈlaɪptsɪç ˈmɔʏtn̩]; from Meuten meaning "packs, gangs") were anti-Nazi gangs of children, teenagers and young adults based in Leipzig during the Nazi period of Germany. During the National Socialist era, these groups sought to recruit young individuals from working class backgrounds with the aim of destroying Nazi control. They were similar to the Edelweiss Pirates, but more politically driven. The organisation however, was dissolved by the Gestapo in 1939 with numerous youths sent to penitentiaries, youth prisons or reformatories.

== Background ==
The Meuten became active in Leipzig around 1937, and were blue collar workers, apprentices and shop clerks. When they were not congregating in cinemas, public swimming pools, or formerly Communist neighborhood pubs, they liked to hike and discuss politics. There are reports of the Meuten in Dresden and other Saxon towns, but the records of the activity is incredibly scarce.

== Members ==
Members came from working-class families and borrowed from socialist and communist traditions. Between 1937 and 1939, the Meuten had, according to the Gestapo, an estimated 1500 members.

== Clothing ==
Members of the group established their own unique dress code, taking inspiration from the attire worn by leftist socialist youth groups. This was done in order to set themselves apart from the German Youth Movement and BDM. Typically, boys donned short leather trousers paired with suspenders, while the girls sported dark skirts paired with checked shirts or blouses. White knee socks and hiking boots completed the ensemble. Occasionally, red neckerchiefs and skull badges were also included as part of the attire, as well as badges featuring the initials 'BJ' representing 'Bündische Jugend'.

== Communist leanings ==
The group had Communist roots, listened to Radio Moscow, stretched the customary bündisch bias for everything Russian, and romanticized conditions in the Soviet Union. The group also used a vulgarized Russian greeting of "bud gotov" (будь готов, "be prepared", which was also part of the Young Pioneers' motto) instead of "Heil Hitler".

The group held strong SPD and KPD roots.

== Nazi reaction ==
They were dealt with ruthlessly by the Nazis. A group of members were convicted in October 1938 and sentenced to between one and five years of incarceration, due to the Meuten being connected to Communism and at the time Germany held legislation that forbade the resurrection of any of the Weimar political parties.

== Memorials ==
There is a permanent exhibition commemorating them at the Leipzig School Museum. The group is also included in the Memorial to the German Resistance in Berlin, Germany.
