= Ehrenfeld Group =

Anti-Nazi German resistance group, active summer-autumn 1944

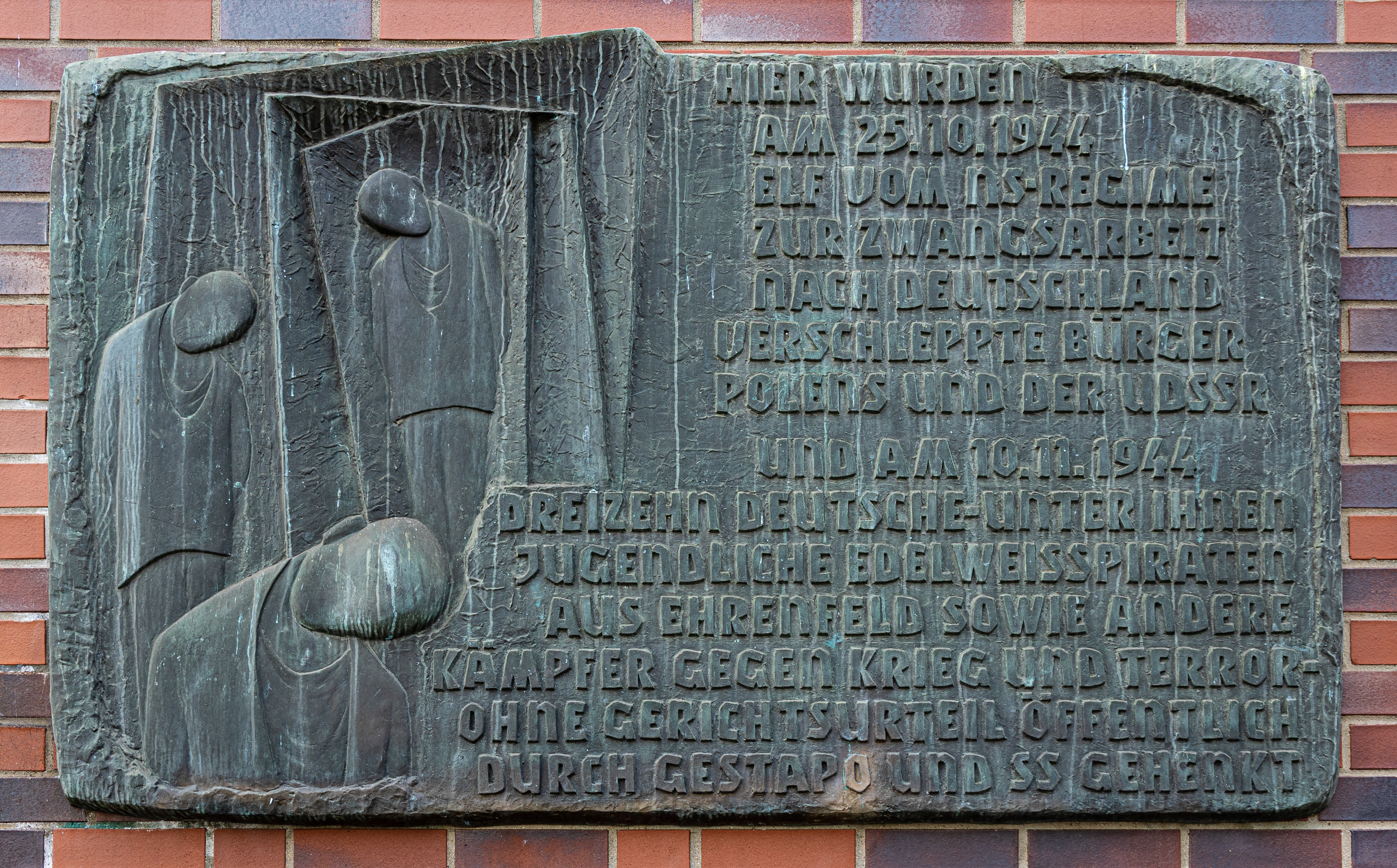
Memorial plaque to Edelweiss Pirates and Ehrenfeld Group members

The Ehrenfeld Group (German: Ehrenfelder Gruppe [ˈeːʁənˌfɛldɐ ˈɡʁʊpə]), sometimes called the Steinbrück Group (German: Steinbrück-Gruppe [ˈʃtaɪnbʁʏk ˌɡʁʊpə]), was an anti-Nazi resistance group, active in the summer and autumn of 1944.

The group, which consisted of over one hundred people, centered on Hans Steinbrück, an escaped concentration camp prisoner. Its members included young people, including teens active in the local Edelweiss Pirates group, escaped detainees from forced labor camps, and Jews. On 10 November 1944, thirteen members of the group were publicly hanged in Cologne.

== Background ==
Largely destroyed by Allied bombings, the district of Ehrenfeld, Cologne was a sanctuary for enemies of the Nazi regime, including escaped prisoners, forced laborers, deserters, and Jews. Steinbrück, who escaped from a concentration subcamp in Cologne in July 1943, came to Ehrenfeld and met a woman who took him in. He began to stockpile weapons and foodstuffs in the cellar of a bombed-out house and stayed in close contact with escaped forced laborers, Communists, and criminals, with whom he did business, fencing stolen goods. His nickname was "Black Hans". The cellar also served as temporary shelter for Jews, deserters and others who had gone into hiding.

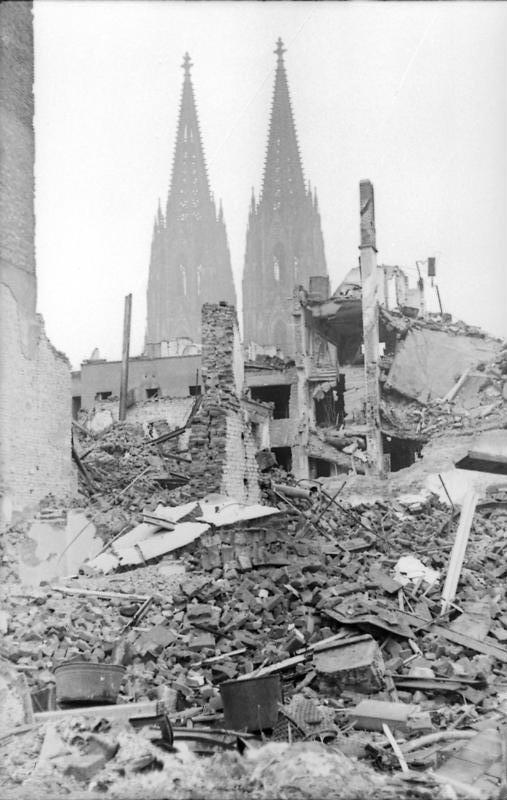
Ruins from bombing, Cologne, 1943

In the summer of 1944, a number of young people, including teenagers, came into contact with Steinbrück. Although being 23 and quite young himself, Steinbrück could easily function as a father figure for some due to the massive rise in the number of orphans in those years. Some of the teenagers had already been Edelweiss Pirates and they began to form a core group around Steinbrück.

The activities of the group began to gain momentum. They stole food and vehicles and sold goods on the black market. Later, they bought guns. As the group expanded, so did the number and scope of the thefts. One particular heist was the Butterraub, the butter robbery. The first time, they stole a few quintals of butter, selling it afterward on the black market for 12,000 Reichsmark, at a time when the average wage was 50 Reichsmark a week. The second time, they stole 26 quintals of butter and got 123,000 marks for it. Several people, mostly Communists, but also some young people, left Steinbrück over this because the activity drew attention and they felt Steinbrück's behavior was reckless, increasing the risk of arrest.

== Denouement and conclusion ==
During a general identification check on 29 September 1944, an army patrol was informed about the group's cellar warehouse. The patrol searched the basement rooms and confiscated numerous weapons. Steinbrück and a Russian forced laborer were able to escape, but the next day, the criminal police searched the apartment where Steinbrück had been staying, arresting the woman whose place it was. Two Jewish women who were in hiding in the building were also arrested. In order to arrest the fugitives, the police posted a guard in front of the house.

On the run, Steinbrück met a deserter, Roland Lorent, who had just killed a local Nazi leader and was also looking to hide. The two teamed up and conceived a plan to go on a "Nazi hunt". They stole bicycles and gathered weapons. They collected a few teenaged members of the group and went to get Cilli, Steinbrück's girlfriend, but without having investigated the situation at her place. When they got there, they found a police guard. Both Steinbrück and Lorent opened fire, seriously injuring the guard. A member of the SA, riding toward them on a bicycle, was also killed, as was a man wearing boots, who they assumed was a Nazi. Later, they went to an embankment by the train tracks to wait. While there, they fired into a group of people, killing a member of the Hitler Youth.

That evening, they tried to steal some explosives, but the guard on duty foiled their efforts. On 3 October 1944 Lorent was arrested. On 8 October 1944 the Gestapo began arresting members of the group, and finally, Steinbrück as well. By 15 October they had made 63 arrests, including 19 teenagers. Of those, thirteen German males, including several teenagers, were executed without trial in a public hanging next to Ehrenfeld railway station on 10 November 1944.

Steinbrück described the goals of his group to the Gestapo as,

He and his accomplices would have done everything possible to end the war as soon as possible to the detriment of Germany. This is the reason we had the weapons cache. The factories necessary to the war effort and train routes were to be blown up, to bring the front closer. The most recent members of our hard-scrabble club knew of these plans and supported them.

== List of the executed ==
Steinbrück and twelve of his followers were executed without trial on 10 November 1944, in front of hundreds of onlookers. Among the victims were six teenagers, members of the Edelweiss Pirates:

- Hans Steinbrück, born 12 April 1921, age 23
- Günther Schwarz, born 26 August 1928, age 16
- Gustav Bermel, born 11 August 1927, age 17
- Johann Müller, born 29 January 1928, age 16
- Franz Rheinberger, born 22 February 1927, age 17
- Adolf Schütz, born 3 January 1926, age 18
- Barthel Schink, born 25 November 1927, age 16
- Roland Lorent, born 12 March 1920, age 24
- Peter Hüppeler, born 9 January 1913, age 31
- Josef Moll, born 17 July 1903, age 41
- Wilhelm Kratz, born 6 January 1902, age 42
- Heinrich Kratina, born 15 January 1906, age 38
- Johann Krausen, born 10 January 1887, age 57

== Legacy ==
A plaque in Ehrenfeld honors the memory of those executed there on 25 October and 10 November 1944. A street next to Ehrenfeld railway station in Cologne is named after Schink.

== See also ==
- List of Germans who resisted Nazism
- German Resistance
- Resistance during World War II
