= Florian G. Mildenberger =

German medical historian

Florian G. Mildenberger is a German professor of history at European University Viadrina. He has authored a number of books, including the biographies of Peter Schult and Jakob von Uexküll.
