= Munich Documentation Centre for the History of National Socialism =

Nazi history museum in Munich, Germany

Coordinates: 48°08′43″N 11°34′03″E

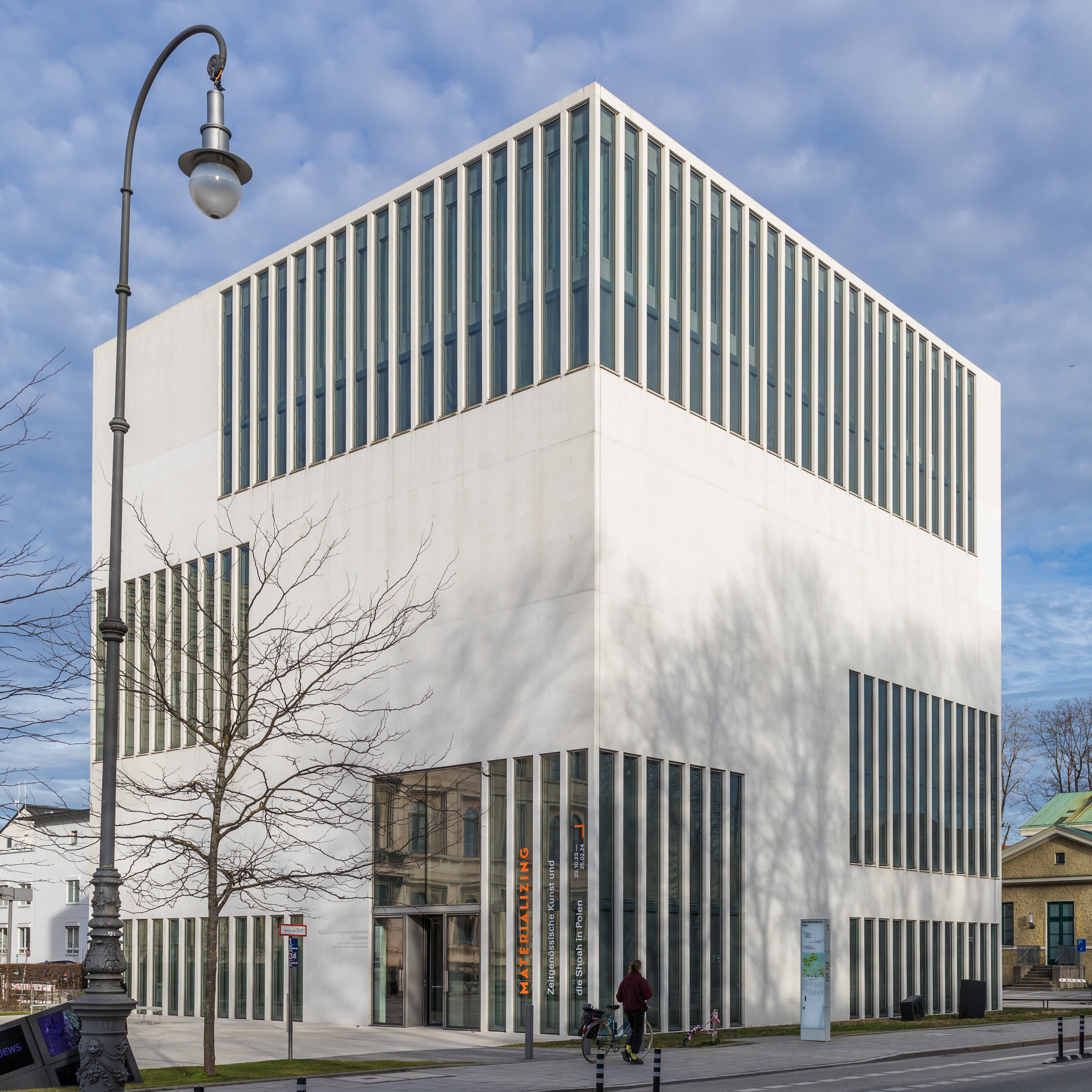
The National Socialism-Documentation Centre, 2015

National Socialism-Documentation Centre, Munich

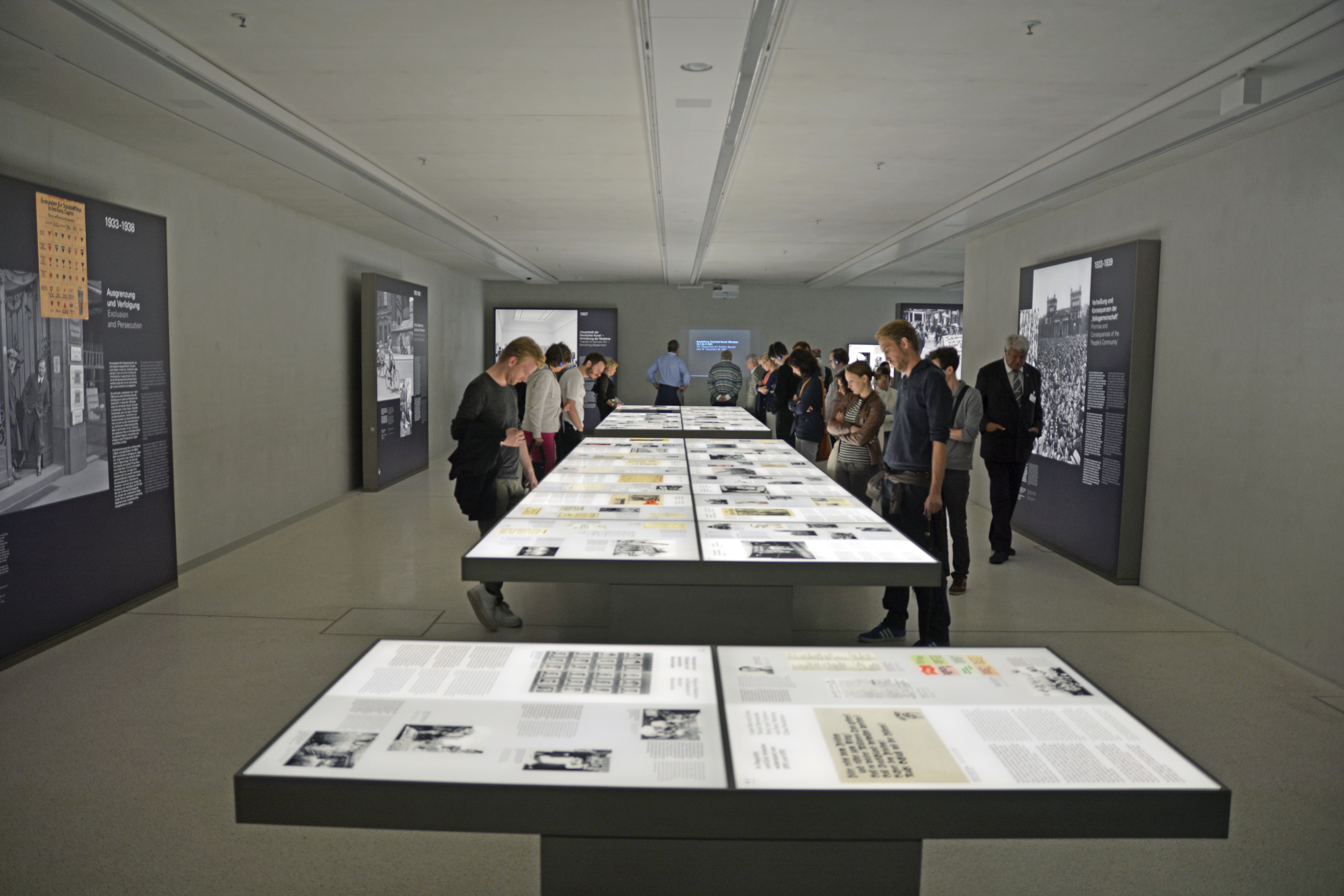
Inside the Documentation Centre, 2015

The NS-Dokumentationszentrum (NSDOKU) is a museum in the Maxvorstadt area of Munich, Germany, which focuses on the history and consequences of the National Socialist (Nazi) regime and the role of Munich as Hauptstadt der Bewegung (′capital of the movement′).

== Establishment ==
In December 2005 the government of Bavaria announced that the museum would be situated at the site of the former Brown House, the Nazi Party headquarters, which played an important role in Munich as "capital of the movement" during the rise of the party and the enforcement of Nazism. The Königsplatz, a square for the Nazi Party's mass rallies, is in sighting distance.

The cornerstone for the building was laid in March 2012. The museum opened to the public in May 2015.

The architectural historian Winfried Nerdinger (de), who helped to establish the centre, served as its first director. After his retirement in April 2018, Austrian historian Mirjam Zadoff succeeded him as director.

== See also ==
- NS Documentation Centre of the City of Cologne
