= Peter Schult =

- Born: June 17, 1928
- Died: April 25, 1984 (aged 55)
- Occupation: journalist
- Writing career
- Language: German
- Movement: Anarchism

Peter Schult (June 17, 1928 - April 25, 1984) was a German anarchist writer and journalist. He wrote Besuche in Sackgassen: Aufzeichnungen eines homosexuellen Anarchisten and was subject of Florian Mildenberger's 2006 biography Beispiel Peter Schult.

Schult was imprisoned during the 1980s for "homosexual crimes against children and adolescents". A petition for him to be released due to his health complications was signed by 4,500 people, including Helmut Gollwitzer, Heinrich Albertz, Volker Schlöndorff, and Bundestag member Rudolf Schöfberger.
