= Adolf Kober =

German rabbi and historian (1879–1958)

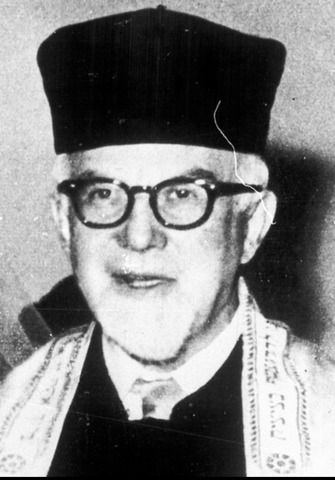
Adolf Kober

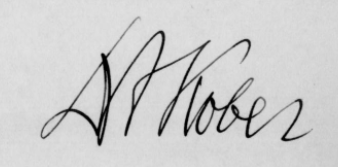
Adolf Kober's Signature

Adolf Kober (born 3 September 1879 in Beuthen, German Empire ; died 30 December 1958 in New York City) was a rabbi and a historian.

== Life ==
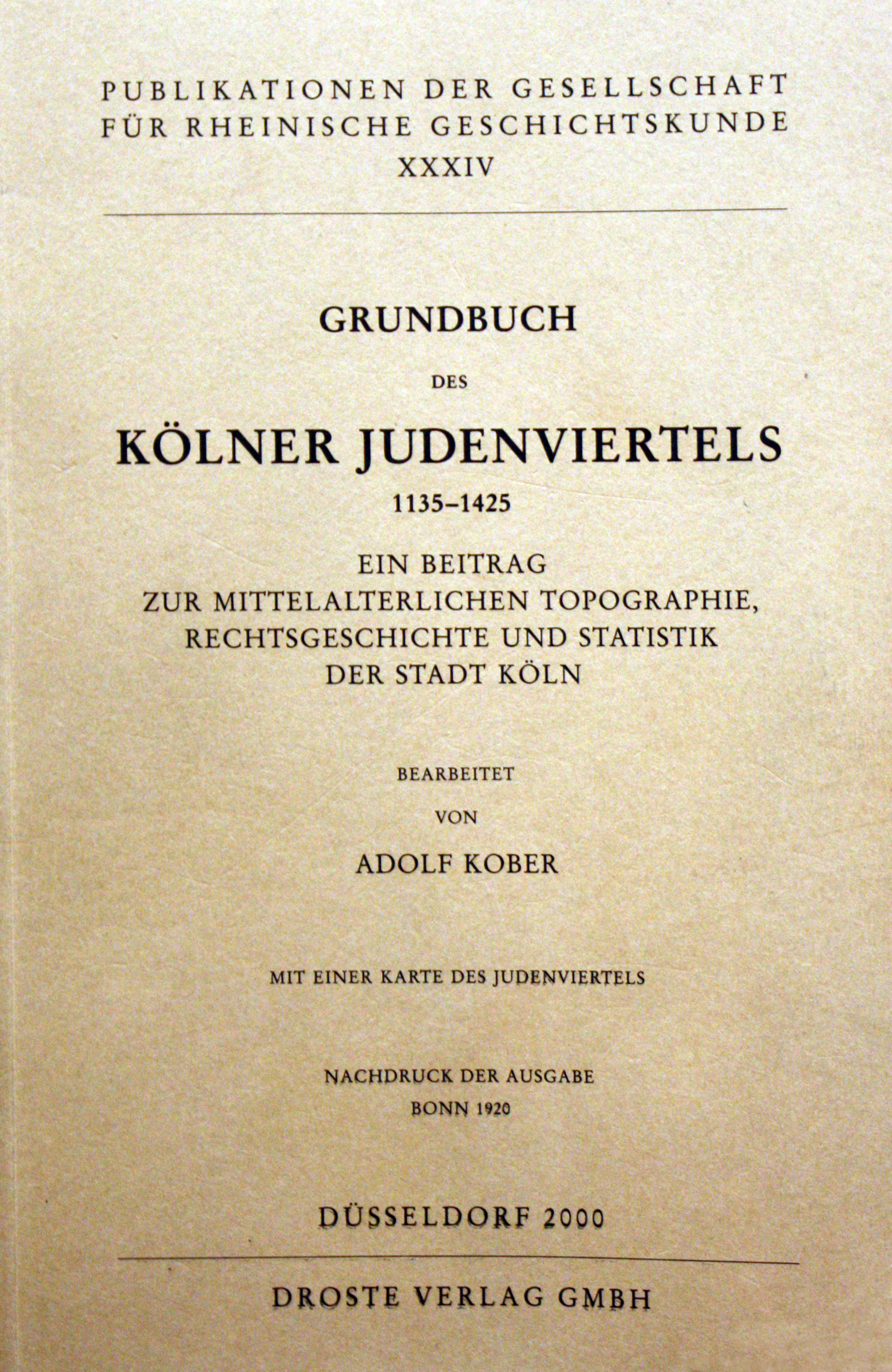
„Grundbuch des Kölner Judenviertels 1135-1425“ (Ausstellung Prätorium Köln)

Kober studied History, Philosophy and Oriental Languages at the University of Breslau (Wrocław) and received a PhD there in 1903 with a thesis on the medieval history of the Jews in Cologne. He attended the Jewish Theological Seminary in Breslau, receiving his rabbinical diploma from Israel Lewi in 1907.

From 1906 to 1908 he acted as substitute rabbi and religious instructor in the Cologne community. From 1908 to 1918 he was rabbi of the city and district of Wiesbaden.

In 1918 he took in Cologne, the then-largest Jewish community in Germany, the office of community rabbi. In 1922, at the time of the inflation, he founded an organization for the relief of distress among people ashamed to ask for aid (Notstand für veschaemte Armte).

In 1925 he took the responsibility of the interregional department for Jewish history at the “Millennium Exhibition of Rhineland“, that took place in the Cologne Fair grounds.

In Cologne Kober started in 1929 the "Jüdische Lehrhaus (Jewish training house)" as a site for Jewish adults education and took the responsibility in the same year of the planning of the contents of the Jewish press pavilion in the large Cologne culture exhibition "Pressa". Beside his rabbi activity Kober devoted himself to several scientific publications on the history of Jews of Rhineland. He was a member of the editorial staff of the Germania Judaica. He lectured at the University of Cologne on Jewish history and Literature.

In the years 1930 he was one of the publishers of the prestigious Zeitschrift für die Geschichte der Juden in Deutschland (magazine for the history of Jews in Germany) .

In 1939 Kober, following the Nazi persecution, emigrated into the United States, where, until his death in 1958 in New York, he remained active as a rabbi and a scholar. Also in the USA he was absorbed by the history of the Rhenish Jewish. He still visited Cologne in 1953 and 1957.

In 1963 the town of Cologne gave his name to a street in Stammheim.

== See also ==
- History of the Jews in Cologne

== Works ==
- Cologne, The Jewish Publication Society of America, Philadelphia 1940 (available online).
- "Jewish Monuments of the Middle Ages in Germany. One Hundred and Ten Tombstone Inscriptions from Speyer, Cologne, Nuremberg and Worms (1085-c. 1428), Part 1," in: Proceedings of the American Academy for Jewish Research 14 (1944). p. 149–220, Part 2, in: ibidem 15 (1945). p. 1–91.
- Studien zur mittelalterlichen Geschichte der Juden in Köln am Rhein, insbesondere ihres Grundbesitzes. Breslau 1903 (Univ. Diss).
- Grundbuch des Kölner Judenviertel 1135–1425. Ein Beitrag zur mittelalterlichen Topographie, Rechtsgeschichte und Statistik der Stadt Köln. Bonn 1920 (= Publikationen der Gesellschaft für rheinische Geschichtskunde 34)
- "Aus der Geschichte der Juden im Rheinland," in: Rheinischer Verein für Heimatpflege und Heimatschutz 1/24 (1931). p. 11–98.

== Literature ==
- Arand, Tobias: "Die jüdische Abteilung der Kölner 'Jahrtausend-Ausstellung der Rheinlande' 1925. Planung, Struktur und öffentlich-zeitgenössische Wahrnehmung," in: Jüdisches Leben im Rheinland – Vom Mittelalter bis zur Gegenwart, hrsg. von Monika Grübel und Georg Mölich. Köln, Weimar, Wien 2005. p. 194–213
- Ausstellungskatalog Historisches Archiv der Stadt Köln – NS-Dokumentationszentrum ‚Jüdisches Schicksal in Köln 1918–1945’. Köln 1988. p. 24–26
- Müller-Jerina, Alwin: "Adolf Kober (1879–1958). Versuch einer Bio-Bibliographie anläßlich seines 30. Todestages," in: Menora 1 (1990), p. 278–296
- N.N.: Kober, Adolf, in Deutsche Biographische Enzyklopädie. Vol. 5 Munich 1999. p. 635
- Wiesemann, Falk (Hg.), Zur Geschichte und Kultur der Juden im Rheinland, mit Beitr. von Adolf Kober, Elisabeth Moses u. Friedrich Wilhelm Bredt. New edition by Falk Wiesemann, Düsseldorf 1985
- Lexikon des Judentums, Bertelsmann Lexikon-Verlag, Gütersloh 1971, ISBN 3-570-05964-2, Sp.385
