= EL-DE Haus =

Former headquarters of the Gestapo in Cologne, Germany

Coordinates: 50°56′27″N 6°57′01″E

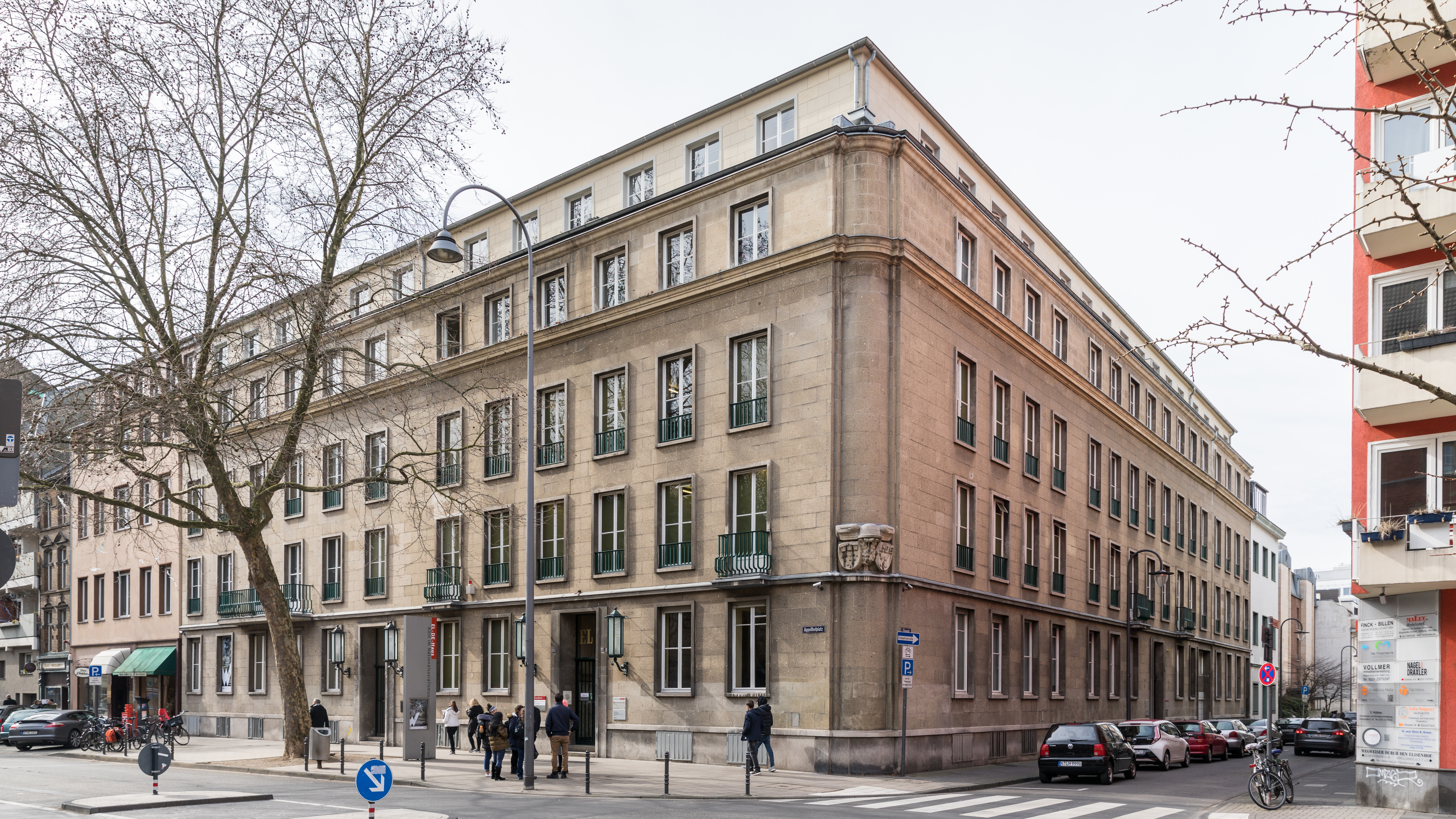
EL-DE Haus, exterior view

EL-DE Haus, Cologne

The EL-DE Haus is a building in Cologne, Germany. It is the former headquarters of the Gestapo and is now the location of the NS Documentation Centre of the City of Cologne, a museum documenting the Third Reich.

The building was initially the business premises of jeweller Leopold Dahmen, and the building takes its name from his initials. In 1934, the government of Nazi Germany rented the building from him and turned it into the headquarters of the secret police, the Gestapo. Surprisingly, the building survived the Allied bombing of Cologne during World War II, while 90% of the city was destroyed. After the bombings, the basements of the building, which had been used as prison cells and torture rooms for forced labourers and political enemies, were used to store wartime files and paperwork. Inscriptions made on the walls of the prison cells by inmates can still be viewed today. The building was the site of many executions, as well as deaths due to overcrowding and poor hygienic conditions.

In 2006, the Documentation Centre on National Socialism was awarded the Best in Heritage award, which is given to select museums. The only other German museum to have won the prize is the Buddenbrook Museum in Lübeck.

== EL-DE Haus gallery ==
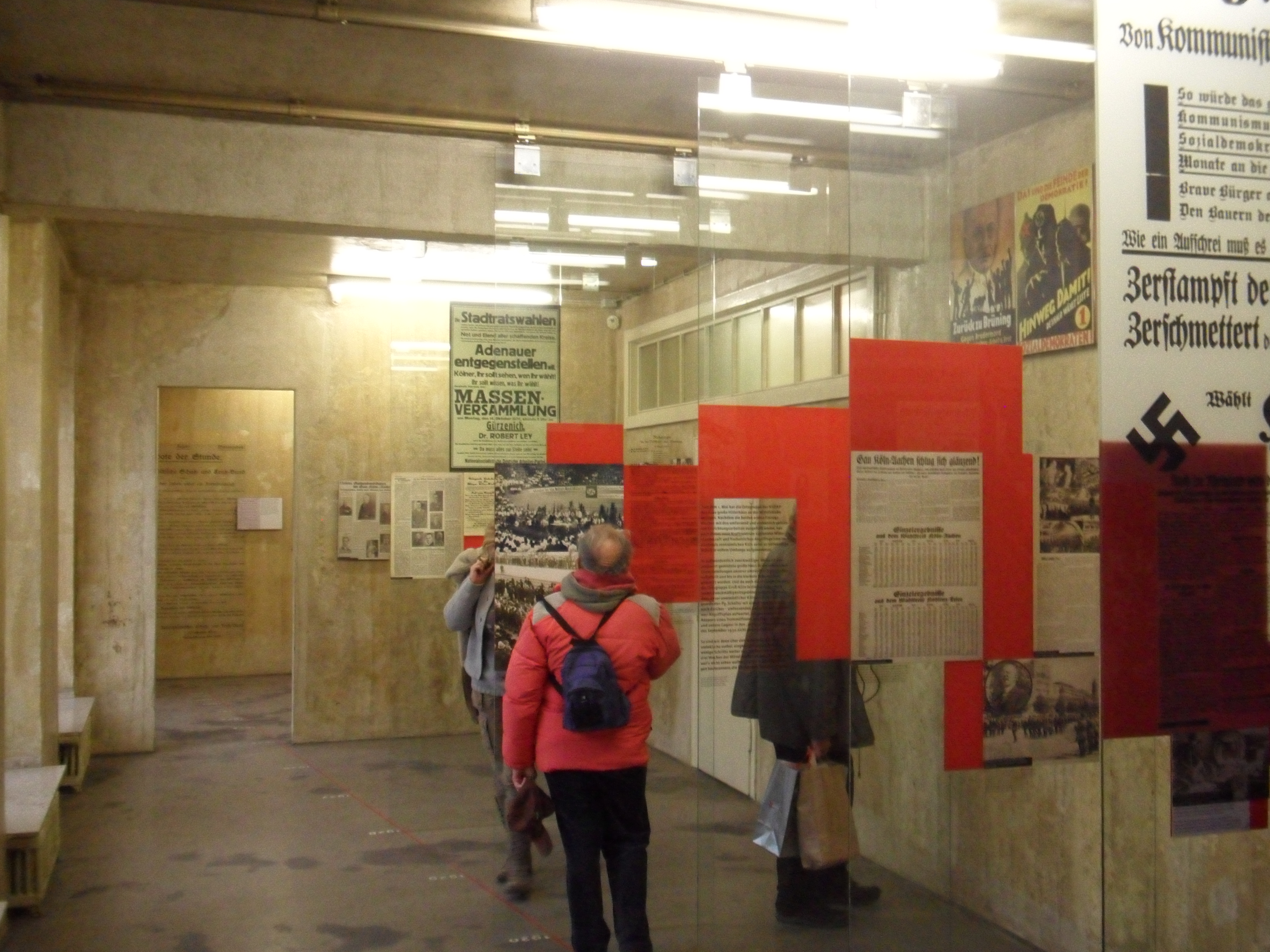
Museum in upper floor

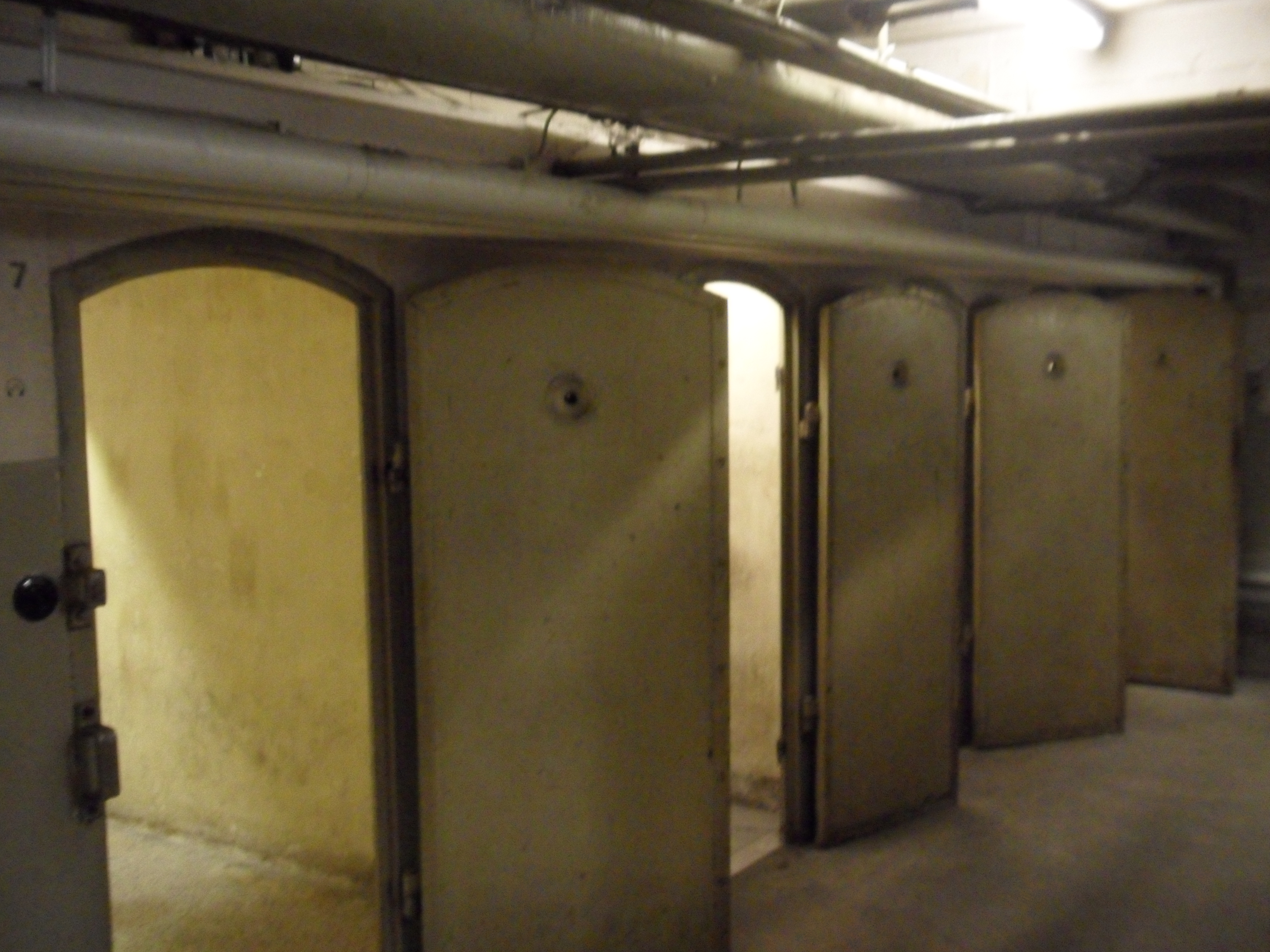
Basement cell block

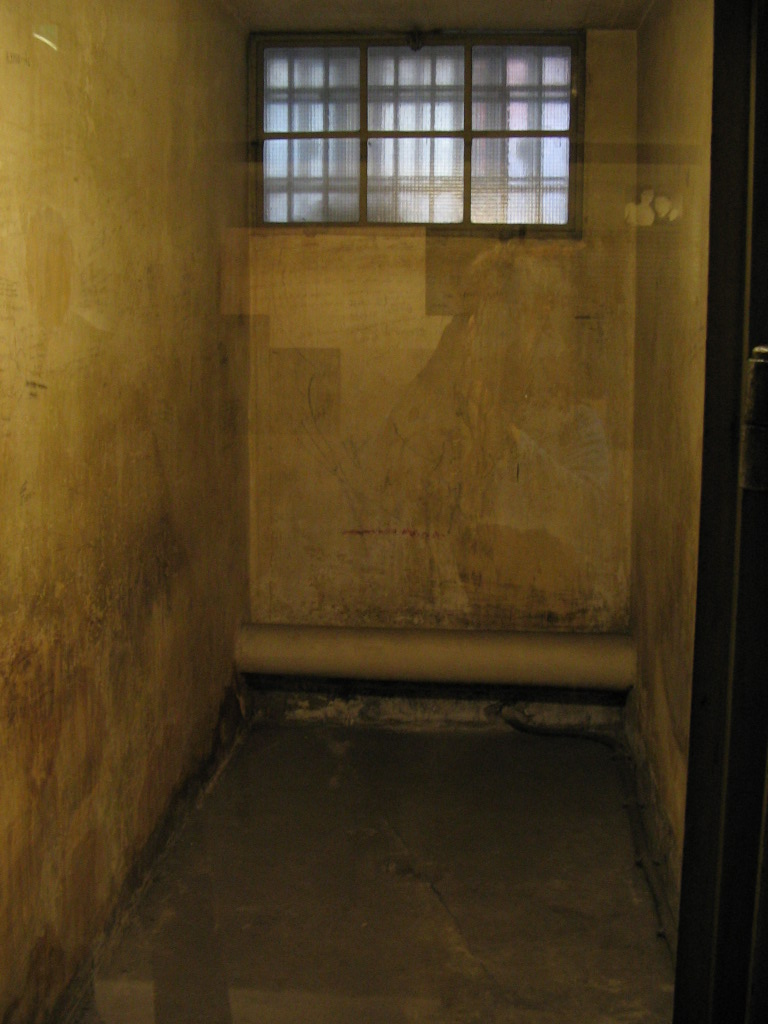
Cell 1 in basement

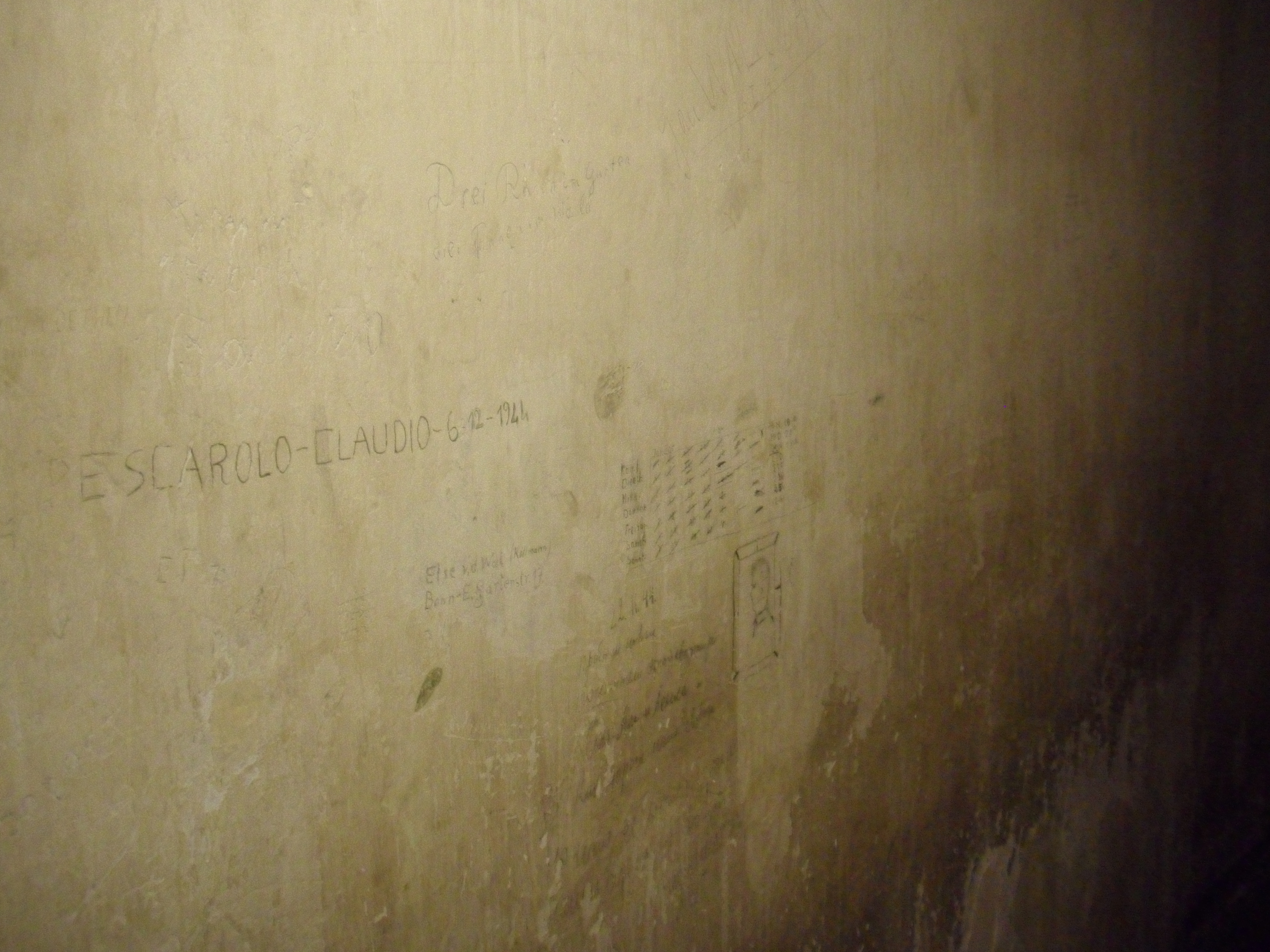
Original graffiti in basement cell
