= Rolf Joseph =

Holocaust survivor, manager and educator

- Rolf and his brother Alfred Joseph, both who survived World War II concealment and persecution, photograph taken by Wolfgang Haas
- Born: December 11, 1920; Germany
- Died: November 28, 2012 (aged 91); Germany
- Years active: Carpenter, manager at the German wagon and machine factory
- Known for: Surviving Jewish persecution, concealment, and torture from Gestapo during World War II

Rolf Joseph (December 11, 1920 – November 28, 2012) was a witness and person persecuted by the Nazi regime. He grew up with his brother in Berlin, having a typical childhood of school and soccer-playing until the persecution of the Jews began in the 1930s. His first initiation was when a schoolteacher began wearing a Sturmabteilung (SA) uniform and began beating Jewish schoolchildren. Rolf left school at the age of 14 and began to work as a carpenter's apprentice. When forced labor was inflicted on Jewish men, he worked at IG Farben. He was also forced to make equipment and uniforms for the Wehrmacht (Nazi armed forces). On November 10, 1938, he saw and was afraid by the devastation of Kristallnacht (Night of Broken Glass) to Jewish businesses and synagogues.

After his parents were taken from their home to concentration camps, Rolf and his brother Alfred went into hiding, only possessing what they could carry. After some months, they were taken in by Marie Burde, who fed them and sheltered them in her apartment. She had few possessions, but she fed them and a friend Arthur Fordanski from her rationed food and what discarded vegetables that she picked up from the weekly markets. They kept warm from the many newspapers that were stacked up in her apartment.

Rolf was subject to severe beatings from the Gestapo that left him with lifelong epileptic seizures. He escaped during a train ride to Auschwitz concentration camp and later by jumping out of a hospital building. After Berlin was bombed in 1943, Burde and the three young men went to live on a plot of land that she owned outside of Berlin. They build a crude shelter and then lived there until Burde was assigned a room. Rolf stayed hidden until the Red Army entered the city in 1945. His brother Alfred had been captured and was held in a concentration camp until the end of the war. Burde and Fordanski survived the war. His large family did not, except for the wife of one of Rolf's cousins.

After the war, Rolf met with schoolchildren to tell them his war-time story. He received the Federal Cross of Merit (Bundesverdienstkreuz) in 2002 for his commitment.

== Early life ==
Joseph came from a religious Jewish family, the son of the textile salesman Hermann Joseph and his wife Recha, in the Kreuzberg district of Berlin.

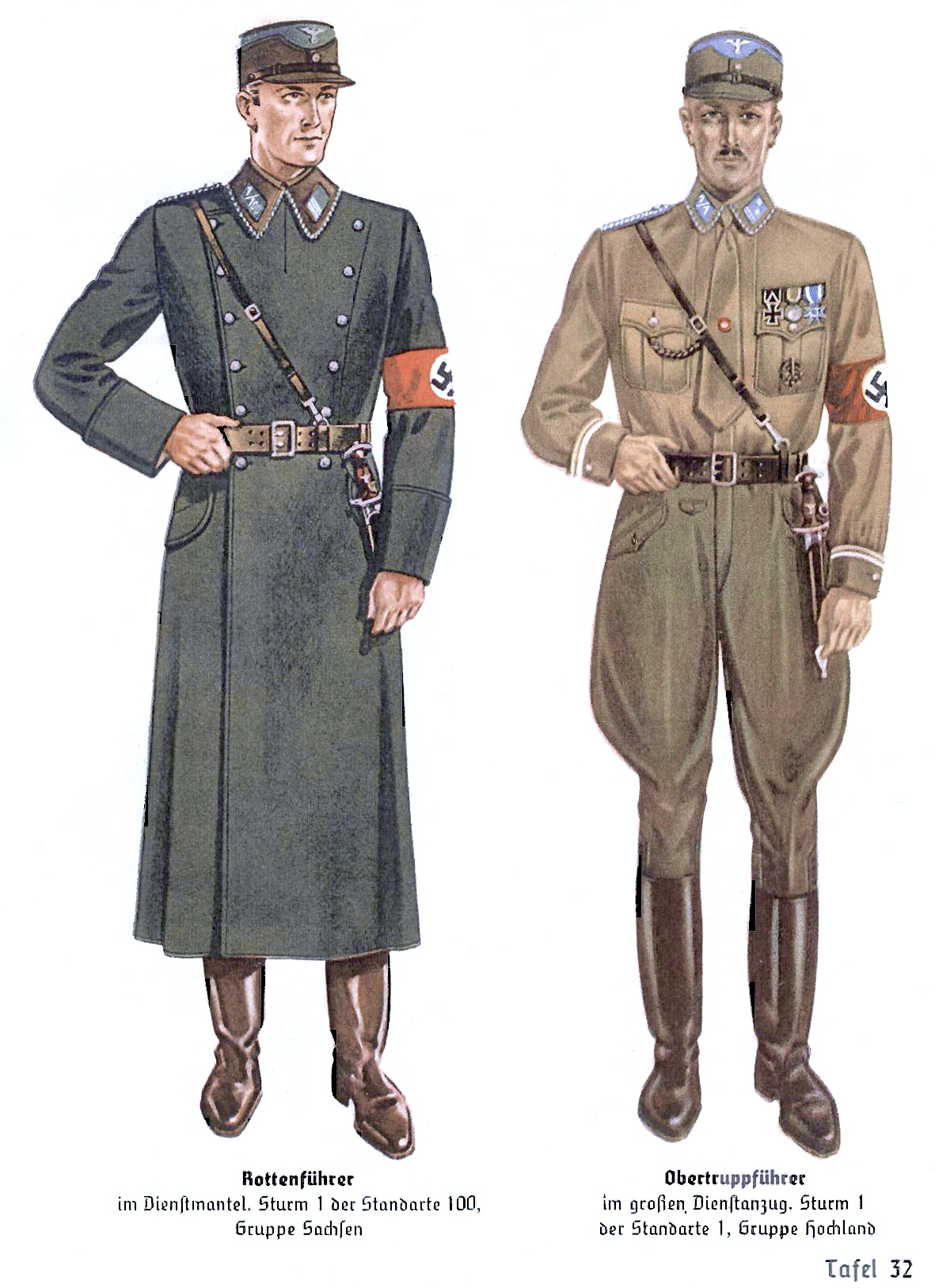
Examples of Sturmabteilung (SA) uniforms

His brother Alfred, one year younger than Rolf, was nicknamed "kleene keule" (small club). Rolf grew up with him in the Moritzplatz and Wedding districts of Berlin. The boys were interested in soccer. They were persecuted due to Nazi pogroms before the war. Their family had trouble surviving and buying enough food to eat due to high inflation. Rolf and Alfred participated in Habonim (what became the Habonim Dror), the Jewish youth movement. Rolf's school teacher began wearing a Sturmabteilung (SA) uniform and began beating Jewish students. Rolf stopped attending school at the age of fourteen and entered an apprenticeship as a carpenter. He was unable to say that he was Jewish, though.

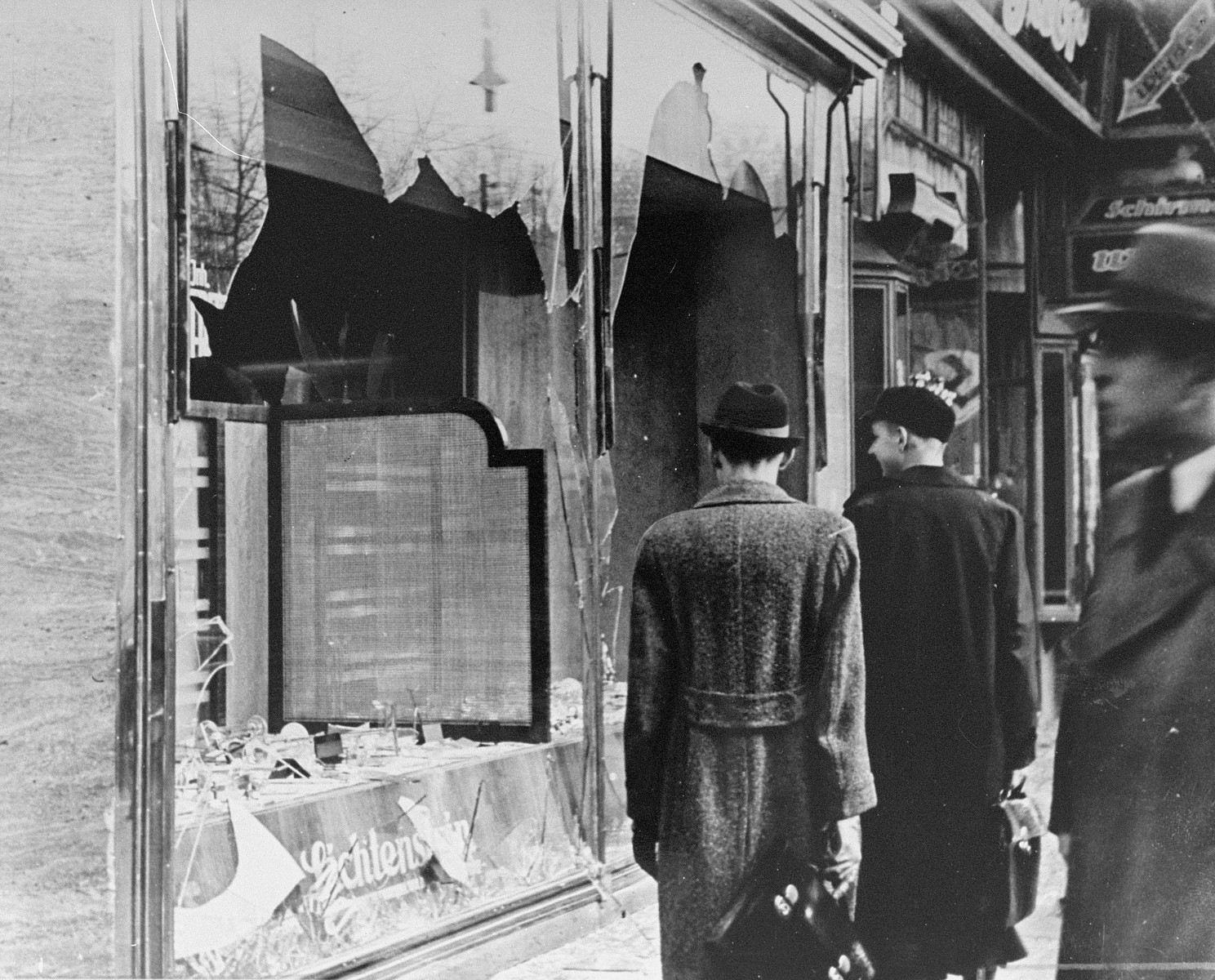
November 10, 1938, the day after Kristallnacht (Night of Broken Glass)

Rolf Joseph traveled to the Ostbahnhof (Berlin East), where he attended a vocational school, on November 10, 1938, when he saw that devastation of Kristallnacht (Night of Broken Glass) that began the previous night. Jewish shops and synagogues were targeted, with windows broken, and buildings set on fire by some Berliners and the SA. The boys asked their patriotic father to leave Germany, but he was loyal to the country that he fought for in World War I and received the Iron Cross. Alfred, Rolf, and their father were then subject to forced labor. Rolf was assigned to work at IG Farben in Lichtenberg, and Alfred and his father worked constructing tracks. The men worked 12 hours a day. Rolf also made equipment for the Wehrmacht (Nazi armed forces) in a carpentry shop in the Pankow district of Berlin. Rolf was able to return to his job with the help of a master carpenter.

== World War II ==
Jews were persecuted by Hitler before the war. Rolf, who had worked in a factory making military uniforms, thought that war might make things easier for him. He said of that time, "When war was declared we were happy. We felt that it was our only possibility of regaining our freedom, because it was unbearable how Hitler was treating us during this time."

=== Family ===
Since both of his parents had a lot of siblings, Joseph came from a large family of 60 people. (Note: A man identified as Rolf's brother (perhaps a friend), George Hoegel, was on the sea while the Joseph brothers were in Berlin. He was a radio operator on the U-30 that sank the first vessel, the SS Athenia during World War II. It was transporting 1,500 Americans and European refugees to the United States when it was attacked on September 3, 1939. The ship drew attention to itself when it took uncommon measures to avoid being hit. The ship was blacked out and it zigzagged. One hundred and twelve people on the Athenia died.) Joseph had witnessed his parents being deported in June 1942 and subsequently went into hiding, as did his brother Alfred (1921–2014). Their only possessions were what they could carry and they did not have ration cards or money. Of the Jews who hid in Berlin during the war, they needed money and false identification, as well as help from non-Jewish Berliners to find shelter and get food on an ongoing basis. Only about 1,500 people survived living underground in Berlin during the war.

=== Rolf and Alfred ===
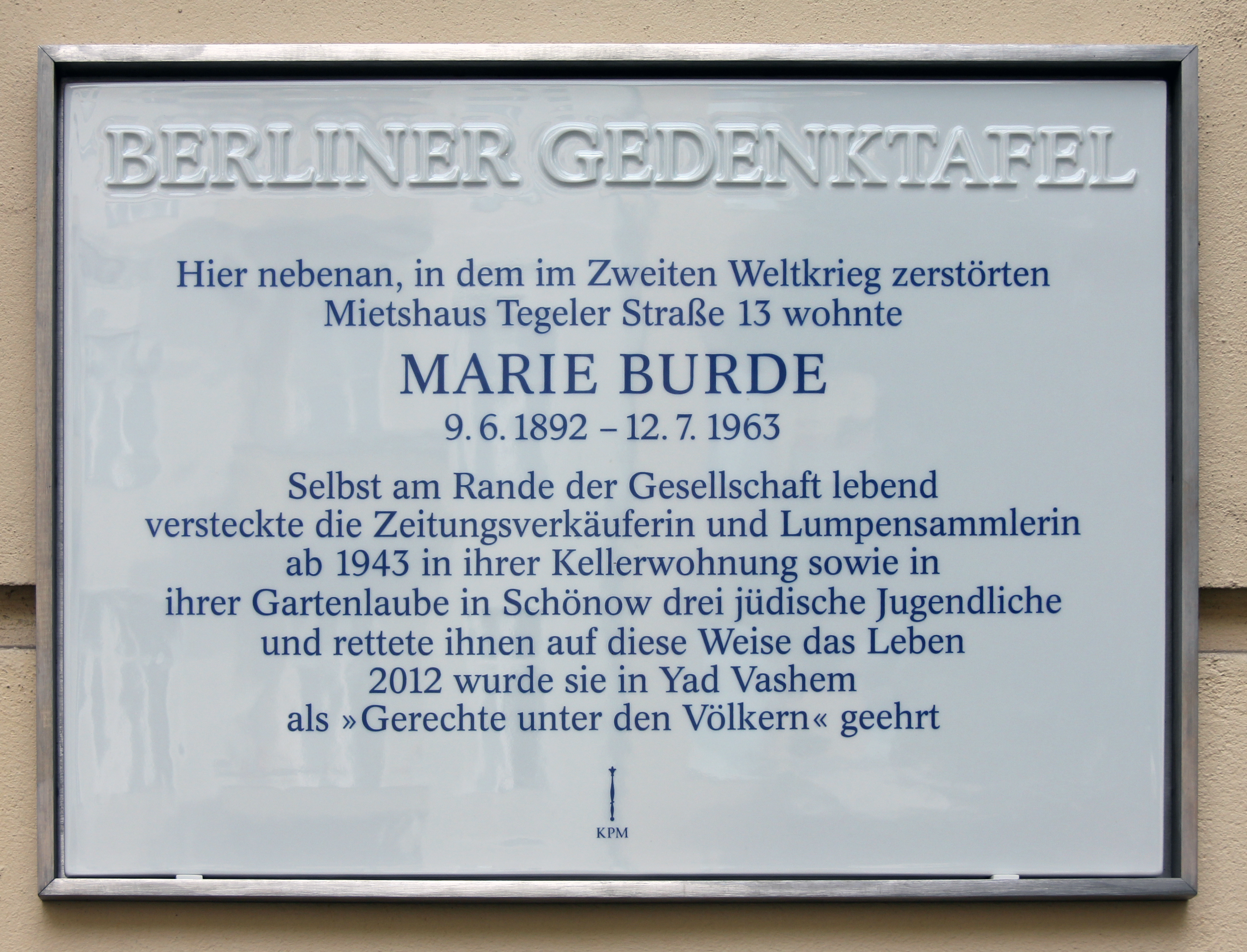
The Berlin Commemorative Plaque was erected in Marie Burdes honor at Tegeler Straße 15 in Berlin-Wedding on July 13, 2015

The brothers hid in train station bathrooms and the forest, evading Nazi soldiers, for about four months. In 1943, an acquaintance of Joseph's mother recommended they ask Marie Burde, for help, as she had been known to help other Jews. Burde took them, along with Arthur Fordanski, a friend of Alfred's, into her basement apartment in Berliner Wedding district, an area that was inhabited by working-class people.

The brothers' mother had left 2000 Reichsmarks with a neighbor for the brothers with which they could buy food on the black market. In addition, since Marie Burde was a vegetarian, she was able to give the meat she was able to buy with her food stamps to the men. Burde also picked up vegetables that had been thrown out at the weekly markets. The stacks of newspapers served as a place for the men to sleep and helped to insulate them in winter. According to Joseph, she was highly intelligent and spoke several languages.

Rolf, who was said to have been tortured several times by authorities, was arrested at a Wehrmacht checkpoint one day, having waited some time before venturing out of the apartment. He was questioned by the Gestapo about his brother and who was sheltering him, and even with severe abuse, he would not answer their question. (The beatings that he received from the Gestapo were so severe that they triggered epileptic seizures for the rest of his life.) Rolf escaped custody twice. On one occasion he was taken to Grosse Hamburger Strasse, a deportation collection site, and then put on a train for the Auschwitz concentration camp, but he escaped by jumping off the train. He was captured again and then he jumped from a window at the Jewish Hospital. Rolf made it back to Burde's apartment, where Fordanski and his brother had remained.

When a neighbor asked about the young men, the story was that they were Burde's nephews. The police came to the apartment to investigate. (Note: There is no known outcome reported about this investigation, but they all survived the war.)

A film shot by the US Air Force in July 1945, showing the destruction in central Berlin

After the house at Tegeler Straße 13 was destroyed by a bombing raid in the fall of 1943, the men and Burde went to Schönow near Bernau to a lot she owned there, where they built a rough shelter (Note: This may be Schönow, Bernau bei Berlin, just 4.2 kilometres (2.6 miles) south-southwest from Bernau bei Berlin.) in the spring of 1944. Burde was allotted a room in Berlin, they moved back. Having been outed by friends, Alfred was arrested in Berlin in August 1944 and taken to the Sachsenhausen concentration camp and then to Bergen-Belsen.

== After the war ==
Alfred survived the camps and reunited with his brother after the war. Fordanski survived. Rolf had waited until April 1945 when the Red Army came through the area. Together the brothers later supported Marie Burde, who lived in East Berlin after the war, where she died in 1963.

All of Alfred and Rolf's direct family members died at Auschwitz. Only the brothers and Lydia, the wife of a cousin, survived The Holocaust. His parents died at Auschwitz, after they were imprisoned at Theresienstadt.

The brothers remained close, feeling each other's pain after the war and worried about each other. After decades of freedom, Rolf continued to have an automatic fight-or-flight reflex, fearing that he was being followed.

== Marriage ==
After the war, Joseph married Lydia, a German Jew who had survived the Auschwitz concentration camp. Apart from Alfred, none of his family survived. In 1991, Lydia Joseph died in a car accident after 46 years of marriage. He married a second time and lived with his wife Ursel Sikora in Berlin-Charlottenburg, where he died on November 28, 2012.

== Later years and death ==
Rolf Joseph retired in 1983 after 28 years as a manager at the German wagon and machine factory at Eichborndamm (Deutsche Waggon-und Maschinenfabrik am Eichborndamm). Since then he has regularly visited schools and told the young people his personal story of survival and also his memories of Marie Burde. He prayed regularly at the Pestalozzistrasse Synagogue.

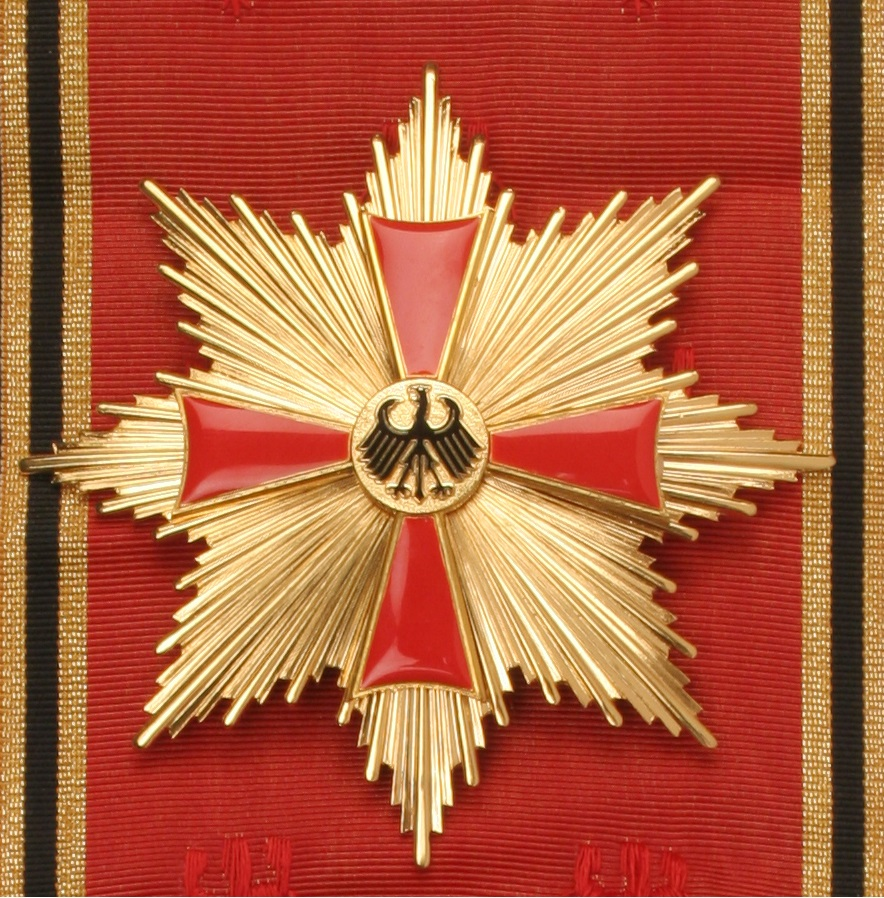
Federal Cross of Merit

For his commitment, he was awarded the Federal Cross of Merit (Bundesverdienstkreuz) in 2002. He died on November 29, 2012, and Alfred died less than two years later on April 11, 2014.

== Sources ==
- Kosmala, Beate (August 2015). "Marie Burde" (PDF). AktivesMuseum (in German). No. 73. Translated using translate.google
