= Marie Burde =

German newspaper vendor, Righteous Among the Nations

- Marie Burde, c. 1942
- Born: Marie Gertrud Anna Burde; 9 June 1892; Berlin, German Empire
- Died: 12 July 1963 (aged 71); Mitte borough, East Berlin, East Germany
- Known for: Concealing and saving three young Jewish men during World War II

Marie Gertrud Anna Burde, nicknamed Mieze (9 June 1892 – 12 July 1963), was a German rag-and-bone woman who hid three young Jewish men during the Nazi era, thus saving their lives. Burde and the men first lived together in Burde's bare downstairs apartment in Berlin, and after her apartment building was destroyed by bombs, the group of four moved to Schönow near Bernau. They built a rude shelter on a lot that she owned there. Burde and three men — two brothers Alfred and Rolf Joseph and Arthur Fordanski — survived the war, but Alfred was in a concentration camp in the latter part of the war. What is known about Burde is based primarily on the memories of Rolf Joseph (1920–2012), who came from a religious Jewish family.

Burde received several posthumous awards between 2012 and 2015. She received the title Righteous Among the Nations and the Silent Heroes Memorial award. The Berlin Commemorative Plaque was erected in her honor, near the site of her former apartment, at Tegeler Straße 15 in Berlin-Wedding. Rolf Joseph was awarded the Bundesverdienstkreuz (Federal Cross of Merit) in 2002.

== Background ==
During World War II, Jewish people were pursued in all countries occupied by Nazi Germany and once captured, they were sent to extermination camps, destined to be killed.

== Life ==
Marie Gertrud Anna Burde was born on 9 June 1892 in Berlin, the only child of Anna and Karl Burde. She made a living by collecting and selling old goods and selling newspapers. Burde lived as a single woman throughout her life, residing in a basement apartment at Tegeler Straße 13 in Berlin-Wedding, that was full of stacks of newspapers and very little furniture. During her lifetime Wedding was a Working-class District. Rolf Joseph described Burde as "one strange woman". She was 51 years old when she found out that Rolf and two other young men needed her assistance. Burde died at the age of 71 on 12 July 1963 in East Berlin.

== World War II refuge ==
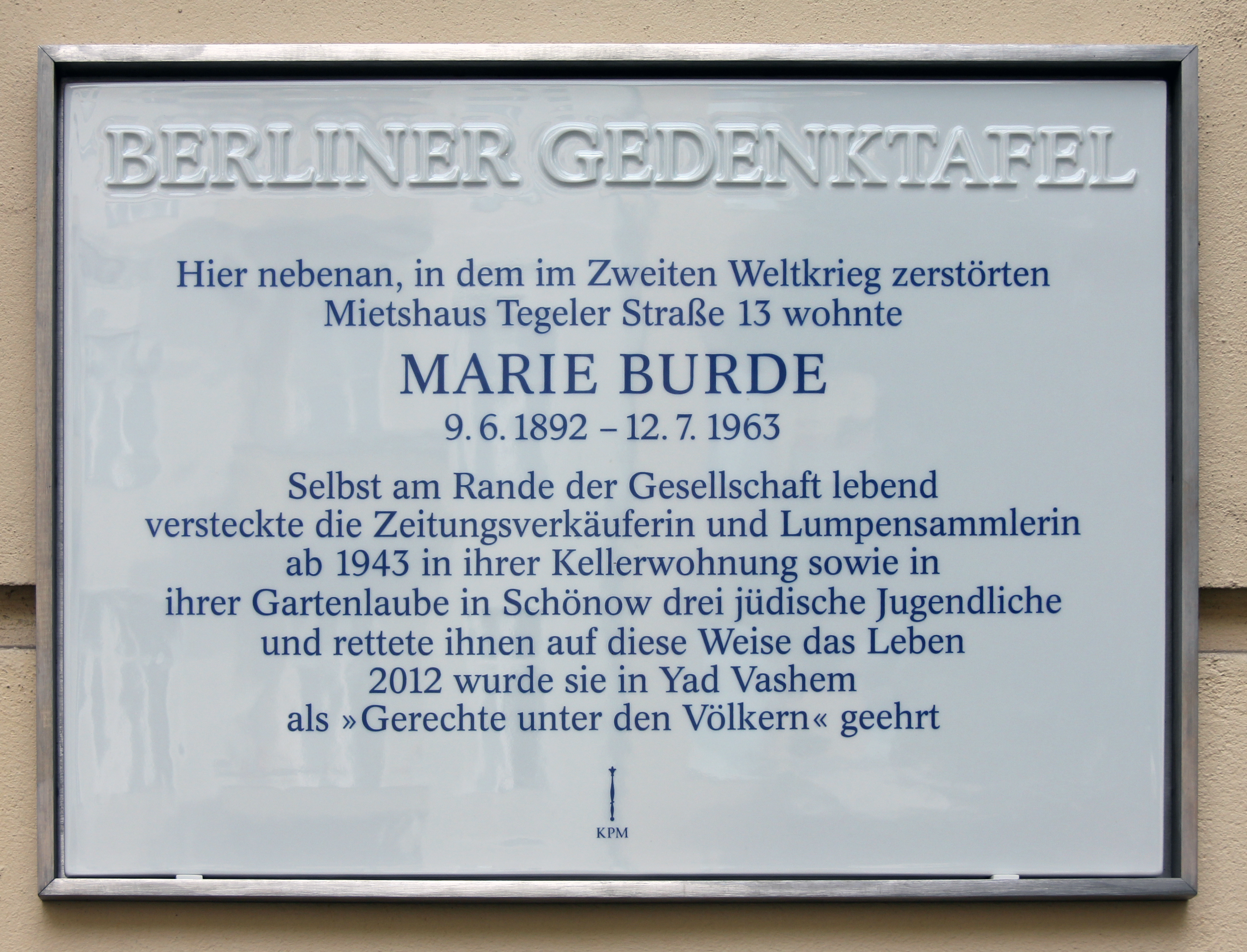
The Berlin Commemorative Plaque was erected in her honor at Tegeler Straße 15 in Berlin-Wedding on 13 July 2015

Joseph had witnessed his parents being deported in June 1942 and subsequently went into hiding, as did his brother Alfred (1921-2014). They slept in train station toilet rooms and hid and slept in the forest, evading Nazi soldiers, for about four months. In 1943, an acquaintance of Josephs' mother recommended they ask Marie Burde, for help, as she had been known to help other Jews. Burde took them, along with Arthur Fordanski, a friend of Alfred's, into her basement apartment in Berliner Wedding district, an area that was inhabited by working class people.

The brothers' mother had left 2000 Reichsmarks with a neighbor for the brothers with which they could buy food on the black market. In addition, since Marie Burde was a vegetarian, she was able to give the meat she was able to buy with her food stamps to the men. Burde also picked up vegetables that had been thrown out at the weekly markets. The stacks of newspapers served as a place for the men to sleep and helped to insulate them in winter. According to Joseph, Burde was highly intelligent and spoke several languages.

Rolf, who was said to have been tortured several times by authorities, was arrested at a Wehrmacht checkpoint one day, having waited some time before venturing out of the apartment. He was questioned about who was sheltering him, and even with severe abuse, he would not answer their question. Rolf escaped custody twice, once when he jumped off of a moving train headed to Auschwitz concentration camp and another when he leapt from a window at the Jewish Hospital. Rolf made it back to Burde's apartment, where Fordanski and his brother had remained. When a neighbor asked about the young men, the story was that they were Burde's nephews. The police came to the apartment to investigate. (Note: There is no known outcome reported about this investigation, but they all survived the war.)

A film shot by the US Air Force in July 1945, showing the destruction in central Berlin

After the house at Tegeler Straße 13 was destroyed by a bombing raid in the fall of 1943, the men and Burde went to Schönow near Bernau to a lot she owned there, where they built a rough shelter (Note: This may be Schönow, Bernau bei Berlin, just 4.2 kilometres (2.6 miles) south-southwest from Bernau bei Berlin.) in the spring of 1944. When Burde was allotted a room in Berlin, they moved back. Having been outed by friends, Alfred was arrested in Berlin in August 1944 and taken to the Sachsenhausen concentration camp and then to Bergen-Belsen.

== After the war ==
Alfred survived the camps and reunited with his brother after the war. Fordanski survived. Rolf had waited until April 1945 when the Red Army came through the area. Together the brothers later supported Marie Burde, who lived in East Berlin after the war, where she died in 1963.

In retirement, Rolf Joseph repeatedly told his personal survival story and also about his memories of Marie Burde at events, especially in schools. For his commitment, he was awarded the Bundesverdienstkreuz (Federal Cross of Merit) in 2002. He died on 29 November 2012, and Alfred died less than two years later, on 11 April 2014.

== Recognition ==
- In Schönow, a district of Bernau since 2003, a street is named after her.
- On 14 February 2012 she was posthumously awarded the honorary title Righteous Among the Nations in Yad Vashem.
- On 12 June 2015 Burde was one of four women honored at the Silent Heroes Memorial for having acted morally and selflessly. The Israeli Embassy hosted the event that was dedicated to "Resistance Against the Persecution of the Jews".
- The Berlin Commemorative Plaque was erected in her honor at Tegeler Straße 15 in Berlin-Wedding on 13 July 2015. In English, it says:

Here next door, in the apartment building Tegeler Straße 13, destroyed in World War II, lived MARIE BURDE 9.6.1892 - 12.7.1963. Even living on the fringes of society, the newspaper seller and rag-and-bone woman hid three young Jewish men in her basement apartment and in her summerhouse in Schönow from 1943 onwards, saving their lives in this way. In 2012, she was honored in Yad Vashem as a Righteous Among the Nations.

== Sources ==
- Kosmala, Beate (August 2015). "Marie Burde" (PDF). AktivesMuseum (in German). No. 73. Translated using translate.google
