= Louis Lewandowski =

Polish composer (1821–1894)

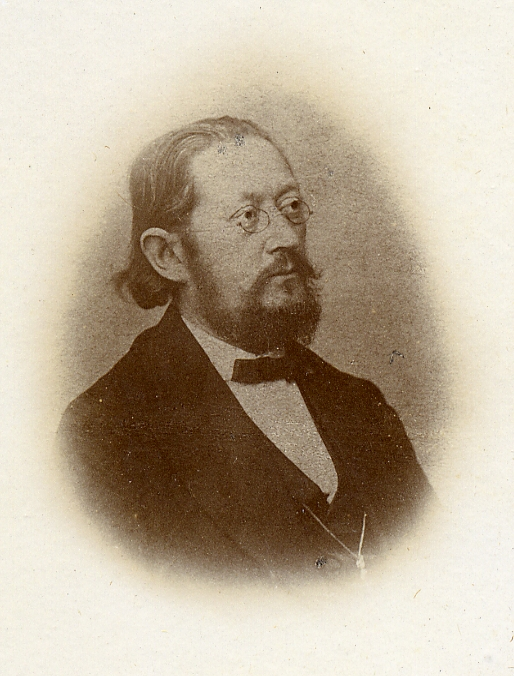
- Portrait of Lewandowski, c. 1880
- Born: April 3, 1821; Wreschen, Grand Duchy of Posen, Kingdom of Prussia
- Died: February 4, 1894 (aged 72); Berlin, Kingdom of Prussia, German Empire
- Resting place: Weißensee Cemetery
- Era: 19th century

Louis Lewandowski (April 3, 1821 – February 4, 1894) was a Polish-Jewish and German-Jewish composer of synagogal music.

He contributed greatly to the liturgy of the synagogue service. His most famous works were composed during his tenure as musical director at the New Synagogue in Berlin and his melodies form a substantial part of synagogue services around the world today.

== Life ==
Lewandowski was born in, what was then, Wreschen, Grand Duchy of Posen, Prussia. At the age of twelve he went to Berlin to study piano and voice, and became solo soprano in the synagogue. Afterward he studied for three years under A. B. Marx and attended the school of composition of the Prussian Academy of Arts. There his teachers were Carl Friedrich Rungenhagen and Eduard Grell. Lewandowski was the first Jew to be admitted to the school at the request of Felix Mendelssohn. After graduating with high honors, he was appointed in 1840, choirmaster of the Berlin synagogue. In that capacity he developed an extensive body of music for the synagogue ritual.

In 1866 he received the title of "royal musical director." Shortly afterward, he was appointed choirmaster in the New Synagogue, for which he composed the entire musical service. The New Synagogue was what would then have been called a conservative synagogue and what now would be considered progressive. His arrangements of ancient Hebrew melodies for choir, cantor, and organ are considered masterly productions, characterized by great simplicity and a profound religious sentiment. Many of Lewandowski's pupils became prominent cantors. Lewandowski was the principal founder of the Institute for Aged and Indigent Musicians, an institution that prospered under his management.

Lewandowski died in Berlin in 1894. He and his wife Helene are buried in the Weißensee Cemetery. On their gravestone is inscribed Liebe macht das Lied unsterblich! (transl. Love makes the melody immortal!) A daughter, Martha (1860–1942), died in the Theresienstadt Ghetto in 1942, at the age of 82.

== Contribution to Jewish liturgical music ==
Lewandowski's principal works include: "Kol Rinnah u-Tefillah," for cantor; "Todah ve-Zimrah," for mixed chorus, solo, and organ; 40 psalms, for solo, chorus, and organ; symphonies, overtures, cantatas, and songs. During Lewandowski's life the issue of whether an organ should be part of a synagogue service was one of major contention. Lewandowski advocated communal singing and the organ was essential to facilitate this. Eventually organs became commonplace in synagogues around Europe, hence the popularity of "Todah ve-Zimrah". Lewandowski's writing is notable for incorporating the strict four-part harmony of church music with ancient cantorial modal melodies.

== Lewandowski's music today ==
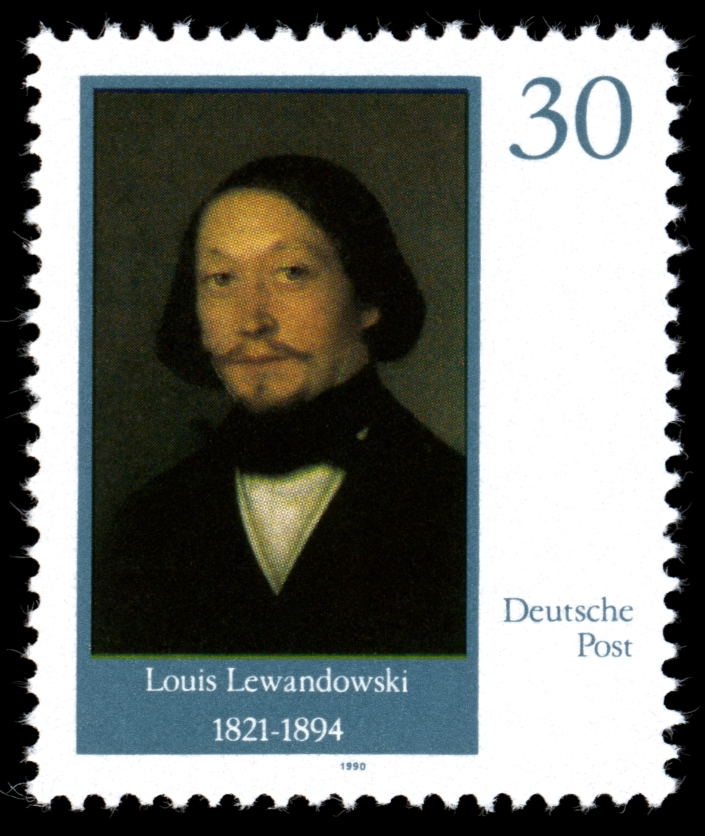
A Deutsche Post stamp featuring a portrait of Lewandowski

Today Lewandowski's music forms a central part of the synagogue service in Reform, Liberal, Conservative and Orthodox communities. Several of his compositions were added to Samuel Alman's supplement when he edited The Voice Of Prayer And Praise in 1933 introducing Lewandowski's music to the UK. This helped to spread his music across the British empire and his music is now sung across the world from Europe to Australia and America to South Africa. Most Orthodox synagogues refrain from a mixed choir or instrumental music, and hence much of this music has been arranged for a capella male choir. Even in communities without choirs one can hear the melodies of Lewandowski either chanted by the cantor or in a communal unison.

Over the past decades attempts have been made to celebrate the music of Lewandowski. The Zemel Choir of London released an album of the works of Lewandowski according to their original settings entitled "Louis Lewandowski – Choral and Cantorial Works". In 2020, Deutsche Grammophon Records released a recording of his "Eighteen Liturgical Psalms," recorded by the Hungarian Radio Choir and soloists, with organ. In 2011 in Berlin an annual international choir festival was started under the auspices of the mayor called the "Louis Lewandowski Festival". "The Synagogal Ensemble Berlin", the resident choir at the Pestalozzistraße Synagogue in Berlin, present full Lewandowski Shabbat services every Friday night and Saturday morning, as does Belsize Square Synagogue in London in most of its liturgy for cantor choir and organ. It has also created digital editions. Also in the Netherlands, the music of Louis Lewandowski is widely used, notably in the synagogue of the Liberal Jewish Community (L.J.G.) in Amsterdam. His music came to Amsterdam with the German Jewish immigrants who were fleeing Germany before and during the Second World War. Most services in the L.J.G. are a mix of Lewandowski mixed with some more modern American influences.The choir of the L.J.G. Amsterdam (Sjier Chadasj, under direction of Marcela Obermeister- Shasha) specializes in the music of Lewandowski and performs in the synagogue on the (High) Holidays and special services.This choir released a CD – Ledor Wador with the Music of Lewandowski in 2017. The Lewandowski Chorale, Johannesburg is a non-denominational mixed choir focussing on bringing the music of Lewandowski to a wider audience. The Society for Classical Reform Judaism (USA), the international voice of advocacy for the preservation and renewal of the historic worship and musical traditions of the Reform Movement, actively promotes the Lewandowski repertoire for contemporary liturgical usage. In addition to the production of CD recordings of this music, the Society has supported the renewed use of the Lewandowski tradition at the Hebrew Union College-Jewish Institute of Religion and at its campus synagogues in Cincinnati, Los Angeles and particularly in Jerusalem, where a Classical Reform worship service and concert have become an annual event. The Society also supports the use of these compositions, with instrumental and choral accompaniment, at congregations throughout the United States, as well as in Jerusalem and Warsaw.
