= Pestalozzistrasse Synagogue =

Reform synagogue in Berlin, Germany

- German: Synagoge Pestalozzistraße
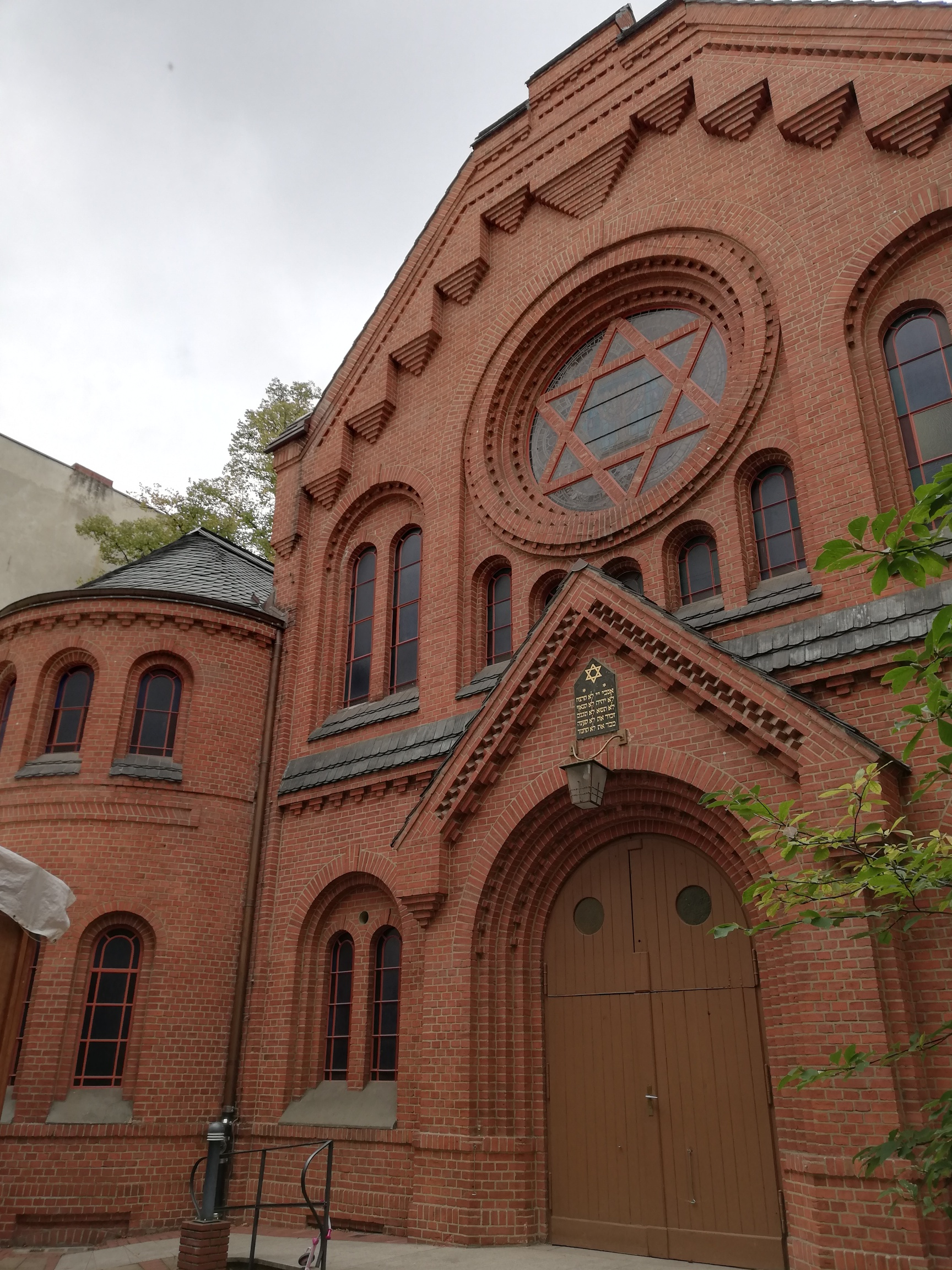
- The synagogue in 2018

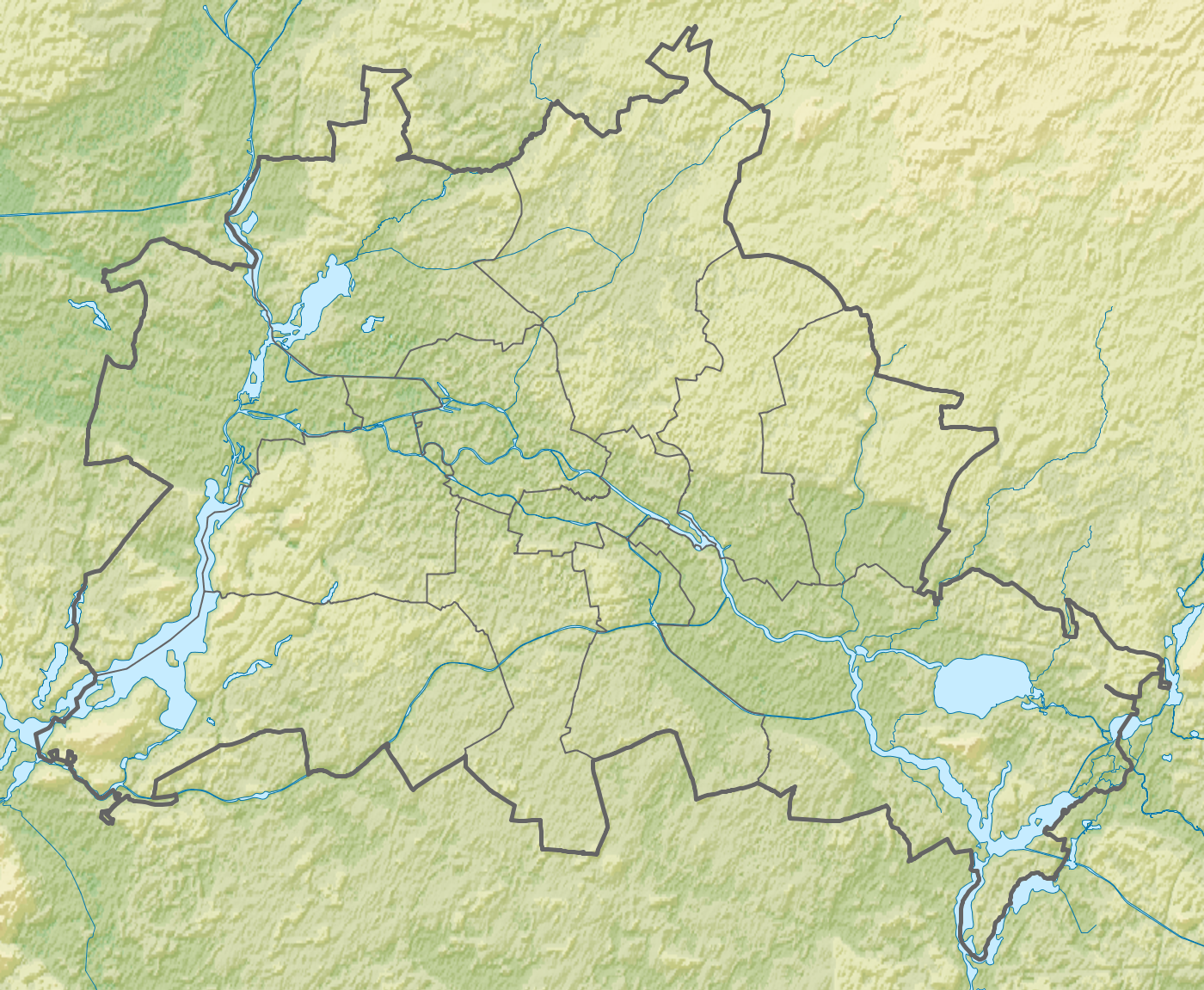
- Location of the synagogue in Berlin

Religion
- Affiliation: Reform Judaism
- Ecclesiastical or organizational status: Synagogue
- Status: Active

Location
- Location: 14–15 Pestalozzistraße, Charlottenburg-Wilmersdorf, Berlin
- Country: Germany
- Interactive map of Pestalozzistrasse Synagogue
- Coordinates: 52°30′29″N 13°18′56″E

Architecture
- Architect: Ernst Dorn
- Type: Synagogue architecture
- Groundbreaking: 1911
- Completed: 1913

Website
- synagoge-pestalozzistrasse.de (in German)

The Pestalozzistrasse Synagogue (German: Synagoge Pestalozzistraße) is a liberal Jewish congregation and synagogue, located at 14–15 Pestalozzistraße, in the Bezirk of Charlottenburg-Wilmersdorf, in Berlin, Germany.

== History ==
The synagogue was commissioned by Betty Sophie Jacobsohn and was built between 1911 and 1913; the architect was Ernst Dorn. It was at first independent, but in 1919 joined the Jüdischen Gemeinde zu Berlin.

The structure was severely damaged on the night of 9–10 November 1938, "Kristallnacht", but was not set on fire. Renovation work was begun shortly after the end of the Second World War, and the synagogue was re-dedicated on 14 September 1947.

Prayer services are accompanied by organ and choir. Much of the music used for the services was composed by Louis Lewandowski.

Unlike many Reform and liberal synagogues elsewhere, the Pestalozzistrasse Synagogue has a mechitza, women are not counted for a minyan, and women cannot recite Kiddush, read Torah, or lead services. The synagogue's non-egalitarianism is an attempt to preserve the traditional Reform Judaism of pre-World War II Germany.

== See also ==
- History of the Jews in Germany
- List of synagogues in Germany (in German)
