= Berlin memorial plaque =

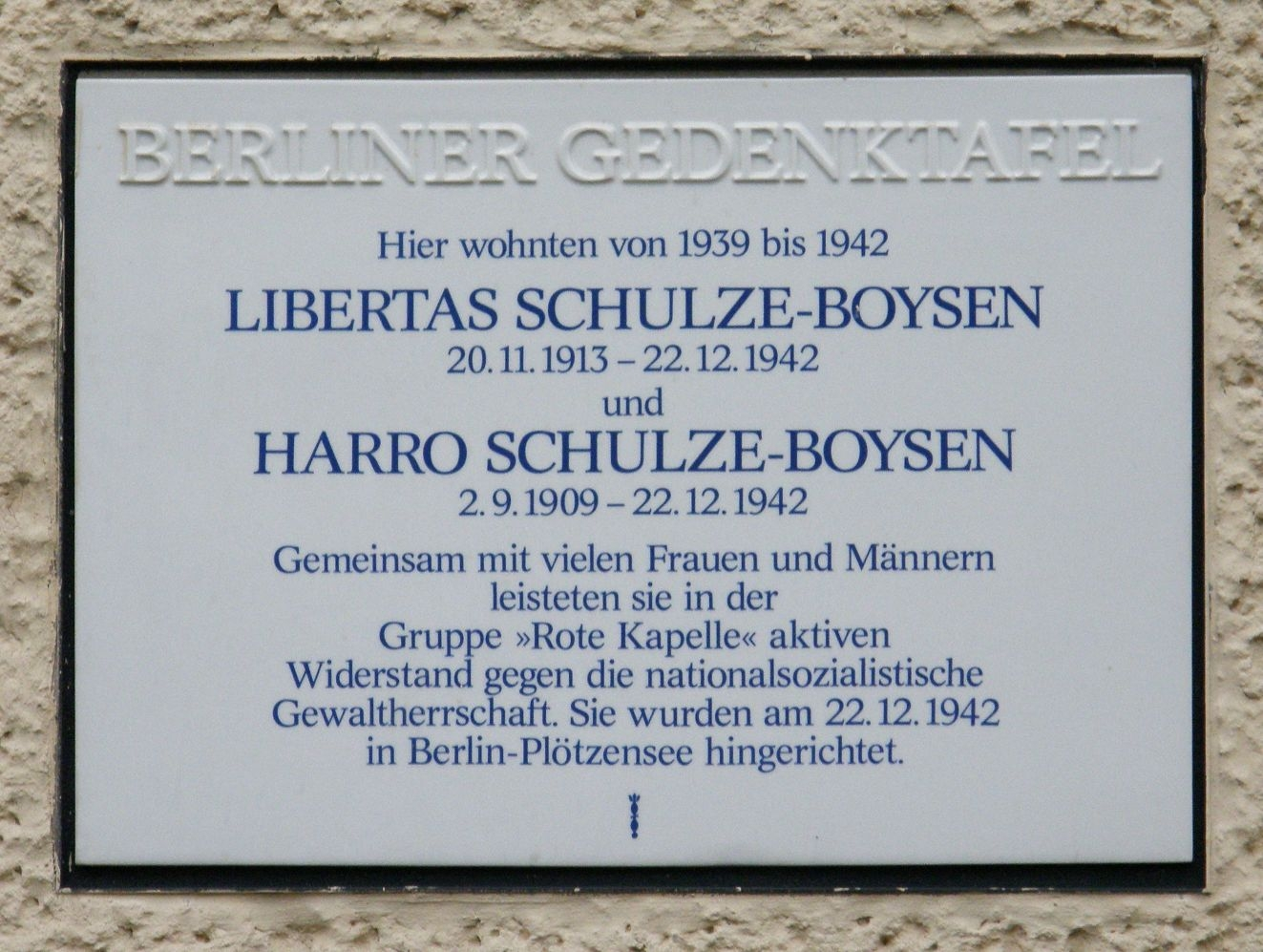
An example memorial plaque for Harro Schulze-Boysen and Libertas Schulze-Boysen at Haus Altenburger Allee 19 in Westend Berlin

Berlin memorial plaque (German: Berliner Gedenktafel) is a special form of commemorative plaque, made by the Royal Porcelain Factory, in Berlin that was introduced in 1985 in preparation for the city's 750th anniversary in 1987. The porcelain-coloured panels have a rectangular shape measuring 60 by 40 centimetres (24 in × 16 in) and bear the title "Berlin Memorial Plaque" in capital letters and a cobalt blue explanatory inscription on a white background. The factory logo is present at the base of the panel, in the form of a cobalt blue sceptre. The design was determined in a competition that was won by the graphic artist Wieland Schütz.

== History ==
As early as the 19th century, the Berlin Magistrate began erecting commemorative plaques and signs for people and events in public spaces. For example, in 1930, the list included 59 commemorative plaques in the inner district alone, with an additional 47 copies hung in all other districts of Berlin. In the 20th century, a uniform representation was sought, leading to the development of the Berlin plaque.

== Chronology ==
=== 1985–1991 ===
Originally, the design of the plaque cost 1200 Deutsche Marks. According to the plans at the time, each district of West Berlin would receive about 25 plaques, sponsored by the Sparkasse of Berlin.

The first three plaques were placed on 22 October 1985.

=== 1992–2000 ===
After the Peaceful Revolution the memorial plaque program was extended to the East Berlin, with the Sparkasse again paying the costs of the program. A total of 350 panels, now worth 3,000 marks per table, were planned by the year 2000. The technical supervision of the new project was taken over by the Historical Commission of Berlin.

By the turn of the century, the funds provided by the Sparkasse had been exhausted.

=== From 2000 ===
After the turn of the century, it was decided that an applicant must make a payment of 2500 Euro's, gain permission from the owner of the property where the plaque is to be placed and gain permission from the district council (German: Kreistag) before proceeding with the placement of the plaque. Once that is completed, the Historical Commission of Berlin will drawn up an agreement with the applicant, to ensure it appropriate. Wieland Schütz then provides the graphic implementation of the text, partly with further design features. The final pressure on the board is done by the KPM. Finally, the applicant ensures that the plaque is affixed correctly, which will then become the property of the respective district office.

== Gallery ==
Examples of some Berlin memorial plaques:

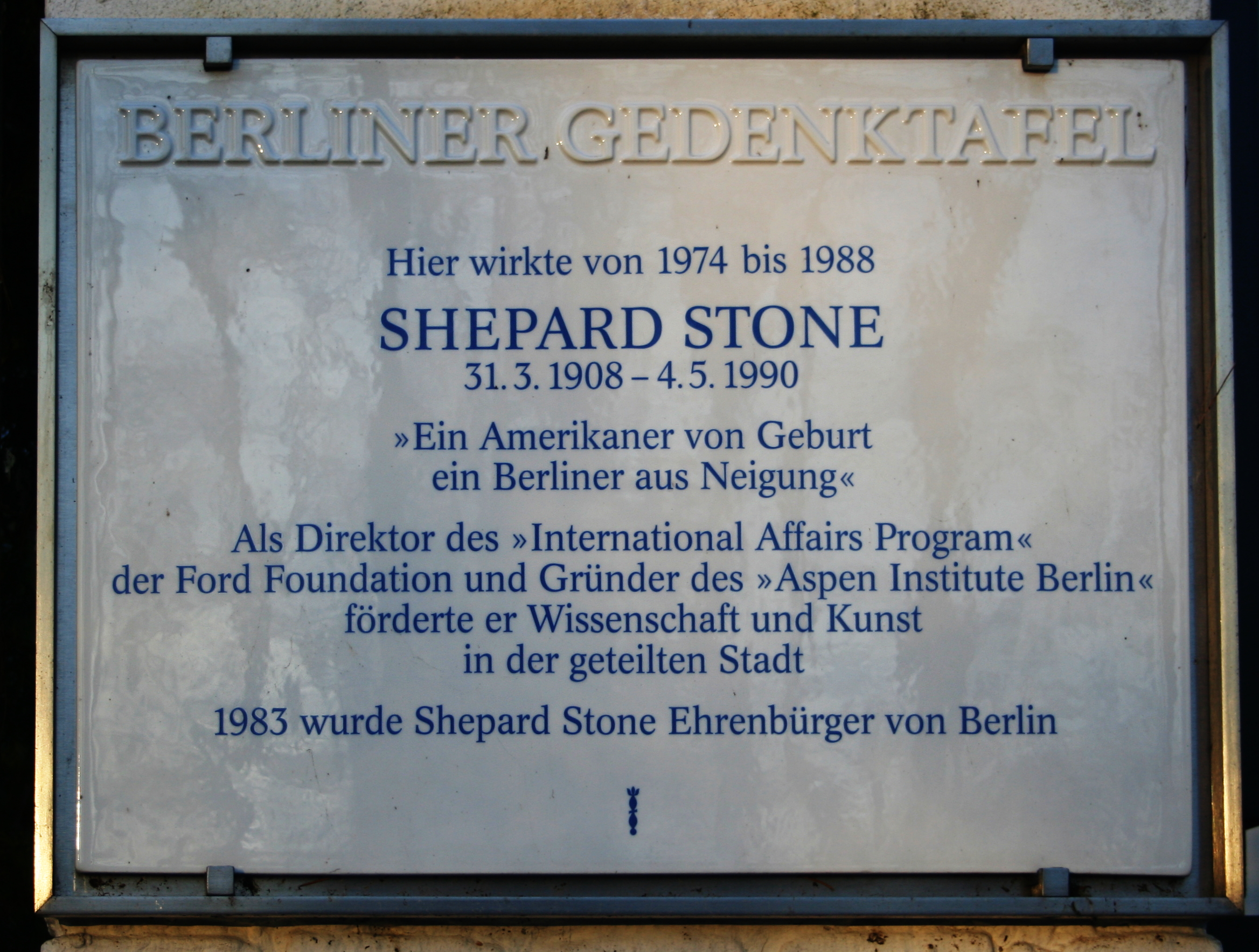
Berlin memorial plaque for Shepard Stone.

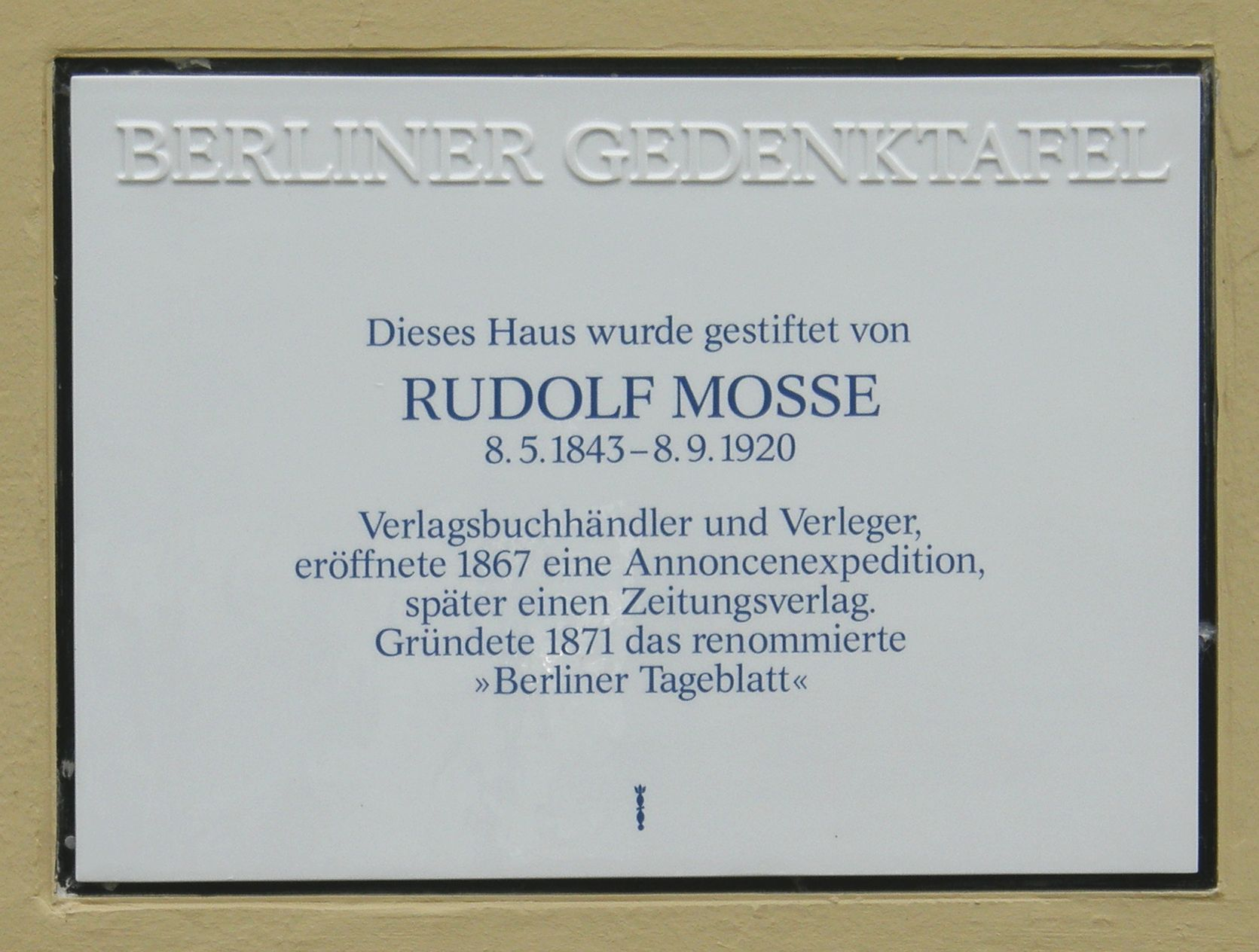
Berlin memorial plaque for Rudolf Mosse at the Mosse pen.

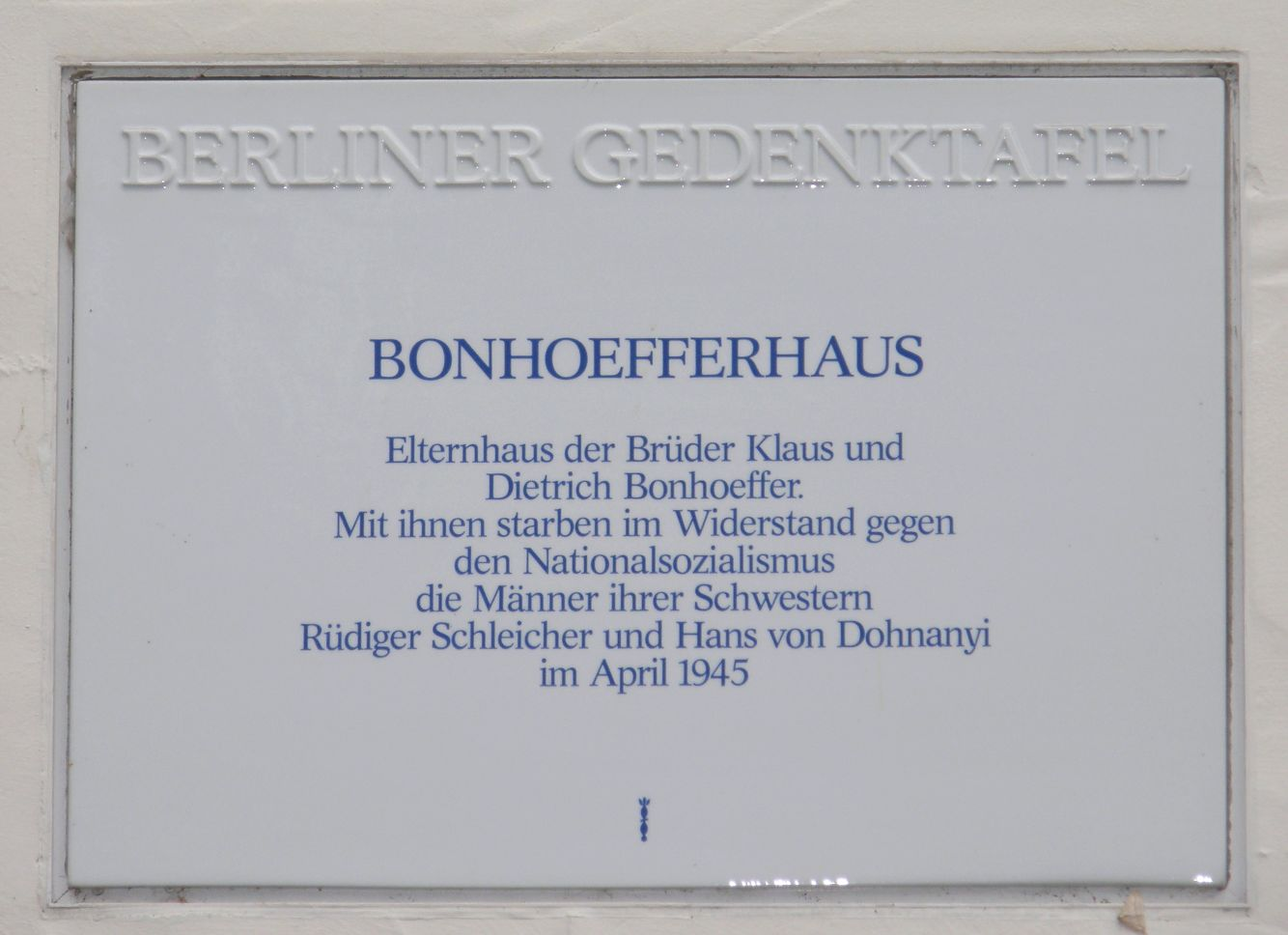
Berlin memorial plaque at Bonhoeffer house.

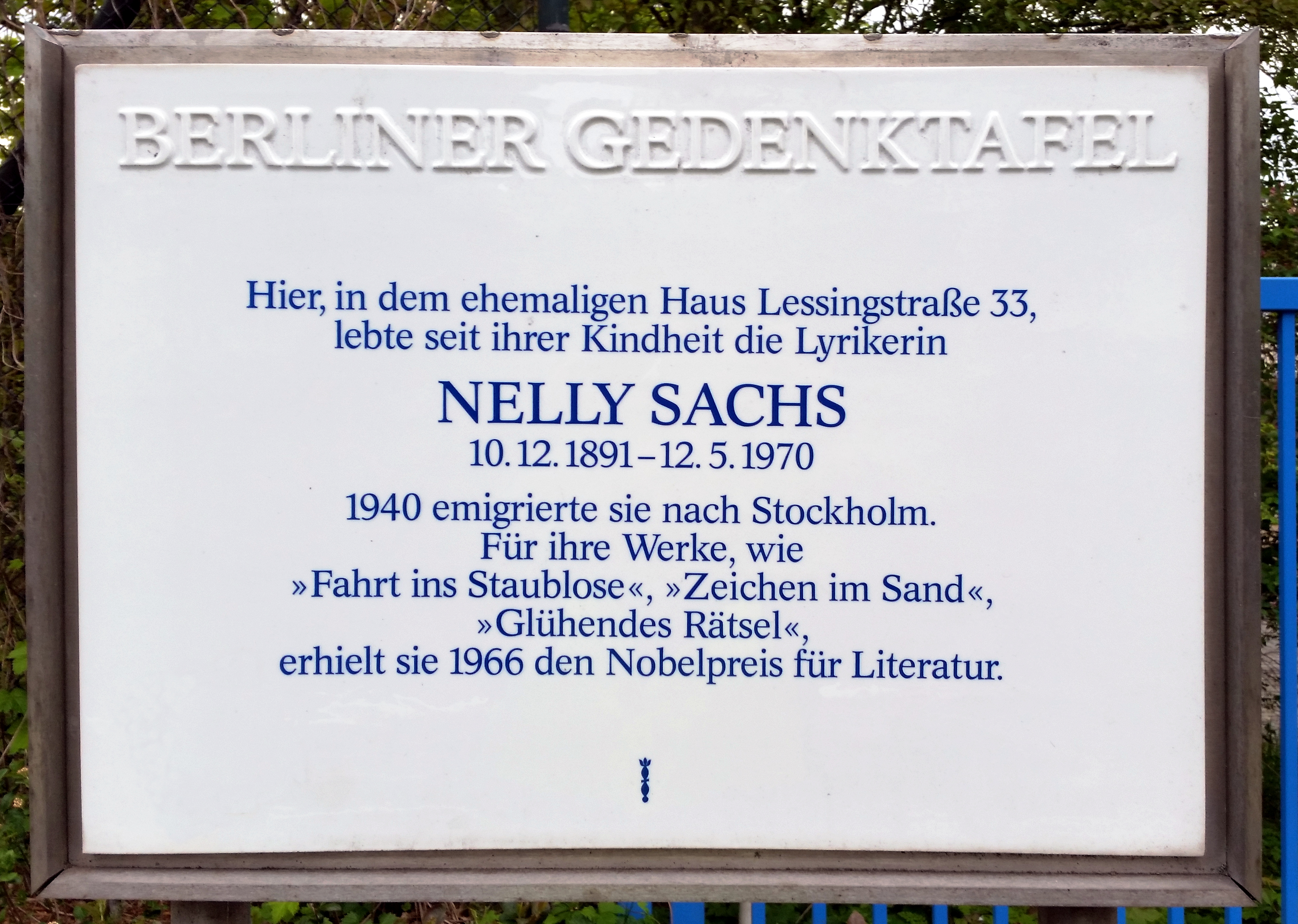
The site of Nelly Sachs' former house in Lessingstraße.

== Literature ==
- Döhrer, Constanze; Hobrack, Volker; Keune, Angelika (2012). Spuren der Geschichte : neue Gedenktafeln in Berlins Mitte (in German). Berlin: Berlin Story Verlag. ISBN 978-3-929829-44-0.
- Baudisch, Rosemarie; Ribbe, Wolfgang (2014). Gedenken auf Porzellan : eine Stadt erinnert sich (in German). Berlin: Nicolai. ISBN 978-3-89479-843-7.
