= List of archbishops of Freiburg =

The following men have been archbishops of the Roman Catholic Archdiocese of Freiburg.

| No. | Name | From | To | Birth | Death | Career | Portrait | Coat of arms |
|---|---|---|---|---|---|---|---|---|
| 01 | Bernhard Boll OCist | 1827 | 1836 | 7 June 1756, Stuttgart | 6 March 1836 | entered Salem Abbey 1774, ordained priest 28 September 1780, became a diocesan priest in Konstanz after Salem was dissolved 1802, became a diocesan priest in Freiburg 1821, nominated as archbishop 7 June 1824, nomination confirmed by pope Leo XII 21 May 1827, consecrated 21 October 1827 | | |
| 02 | Ignaz Anton Demeter | 1836 | 1842 | 1 August 1773, Augsburg | 21 March 1842 | ordained priest in Augsburg 10 August 1796, nominated as archbishop 11 May 1836, nomination confirmed by pope Gregory XVI 21 November 1836, consecrated 29 January 1837 | | |
| 03 | Hermann von Vicari | 1842 | 1868 | 13 May 1773, Aulendorf | 14 April 1868 | ordained priest in Konstanz 10 August 1796, arrived in Freiburg 1821, auxiliary bishop in Freiburg and titular bishop of Macri 24 February 1832, consecrated 8 April 1832, nominated as archbishop 15 June 1842, nomination confirmed by the pope 30 January 1843, installed 26 March 1843 | | |
| 03a | Sede vacante Apostolic Administrator; Lothar von Kübel | 1868 | 1881 | 22 April 1823, Sinzheim | 3 August 1881 | ordained priest 19 August 1847, auxiliary bishop in Freiburg and titular bishop of Leuce 20 December 1867, consecrated 22 March 1868, appointed Apostolic Administrator for Freiburg 5 January 1869 | | |
| 05 | Johann Baptist Orbin | 1882 | 1886 | 22 June 1806, Bruchsal | 8 April 1886 | ordained priest 8 June 1830, nominated as archbishop 2 May 1882, nomination confirmed by pope Leo XIII 12 May 1882, consecrated 12 July 1882 | | |
| 06 | Johannes Christian Roos | 1886 | 1896 | 28 April 1826, Kamp | 22 October 1896 | ordained priest in Limburg 22 August 1853, nominated as bishop of Limburg 19 February 1885, nomination confirmed by the pope 27 May 1885, consecrated 17 May 1885, nominated as archbishop 2 June 1886, nomination confirmed by the pope 27 July 1886, installed 21 September 1886 | | |
| 07 | Georg Ignaz Komp | 1898 | 1898 | 5 June 1828, Hammelburg | 11 May 1898, en route to his enthronement | ordained priest in Fulda 12 June 1853, nominated as bishop of Fulda 27 April 1894, nomination confirmed by the pope 27 May 1885, consecrated 25 July 1894, nominated as archbishop 21 March 1898, nomination confirmed by the pope 21 March 1898 | | |
| 08 | Thomas Nörber | 1898 | 1920 | 19 December 1846, Waldstetten | 27 July 1920 | ordained priest 24 July 1870, nominated as archbishop 2 August 1898, nomination confirmed by the pope 5 September 1898, consecrated 29 September 1898 | | |
| 09 | Karl Fritz | 1920 | 1931 | 20 August 1864, Adelhausen | 7 December 1931 | ordained priest 12 July 1888, nominated as archbishop 6 September 1920, nomination confirmed by pope Benedict XV 12 October 1920, consecrated 28 October 1920 | | |
| 10 | Conrad Gröber | 1932 | 1948 | 1 April 1872, Meßkirch | 14 February 1948 | made deacon 15 August 1897, ordained priest 28 October 1897, nominated as bishop of Dresden-Meissen 13 January 1931, auxiliary bishop 1 February 1931, nominated as archbishop 21 May 1932, enthroned 20 June 1932 | | |
| 11 | Wendelin Rauch | 1948 | 1954 | 30 August 1885, Zell am Andelsbach | 7 April 1954 | ordained priest 28 October 1910, nominated as archbishop 27 July 1948, nomination confirmed by pope Pius XII 27 August 1948, auxiliary bishop 28 October 1948 | | |
| 12 | Eugen Seiterich | 1954 | 1958 | 9 January 1903, Karlsruhe | 3 March 1958 | ordained priest 19 March 1926, auxiliary bishop in Freiburg and titular bishop of Binda 23 June 1952, nominated as archbishop 27 July 1954, nomination confirmed by the pope 7 August 1954, enthroned 21 September 1954 | | |
| 13 | Hermann Schäufele | 1958 | 1977 | 14 November 1906, Stebbach | 26 June 1977 | ordained priest 25 October 1931, auxiliary bishop in Freiburg and titular bishop of Leptis Magna 14 April 1955, auxiliary bishop 11 May 1955, nominated as archbishop 14 May 1958, nomination confirmed by the pope 14 June 1958, enthroned 19 September 1958 | | |
| 14 | Oskar Saier | 1978 | 2002 | 12 August 1932, Wagensteig | 3 January 2008 | ordained priest 2 June 1957, auxiliary bishop in Freiburg and titular bishop of Rubicon 7 April 1972, auxiliary bishop 29 June 1972, nominated as archbishop 15 March 1978, enthroned 3 May 1978, became archbishop emeritus 1 July 2002 | | |
| 15 | Robert Zollitsch | 2003 | 2013 | 9 August 1938, Filipovo, Yugoslavia | n/a | ordained priest 27 May 1965, nominated as archbishop 10 June 2003, consecrated 20 July 2003, resigned 17 September 2013, acted as Apostolic Administrator until the appointment of his successor | | |
| 16 | Stephan Burger | 2014 | | 29 April 1962, Freiburg im Breisgau | n/a | ordained priest 20 May 1990, nominated as archbishop 30 May 2014, consecrated 29 June 2014 | | |

== Sources ==
- Archdiocese of Freiburg - catholic-hierarchy.org ^{[self-published]}
