= Bernd Uhl =

German priest (1946–2023)

His Excellency Bernd Uhl
- Auxiliary Bishop Emeritus of Freiburg im Breisgau
- Appointed: 29 March 2001
- Term ended: 19 February 2018
- Other post: Titular Bishop of Malliana (2001–2023)

Orders
- Ordination: 19 May 1974 by Hermann Josef Schäufele
- Consecration: 1 May 2001 by Oskar Saier

Personal details
- Born: 23 November 1946 Karlsruhe, Württemberg-Baden, Germany
- Died: 22 January 2023 (aged 76) Freiburg im Breisgau, Baden-Württemberg, Germany
- Motto: CARITAS CUM FIDE
- Coat of arms

Styles of Bernd Uhl
- Reference style: His Excellency; The Most Reverend
- Spoken style: Your Excellency
- Religious style: Bishop

Bernd Joachim Uhl (23 November 1946 – 22 January 2023) was a German Roman Catholic prelate.

Uhl was born in Germany and was ordained to the priesthood in 1974. He served as titular bishop of Malliana and as auxiliary bishop of the Roman Catholic Archdiocese of Freiburg, Germany from 2001 until his resignation in 2018.

Catholic Church titles
Preceded by —	Auxiliary Bishop of Freiburg im Breisgau; 2001–2018	Succeeded by —
Preceded by Éric Aumonier	Titular Bishop of Malliana; 2001–2023	Succeeded by Vacant
