= Freiburg Declaration =

2012 Letter from Catholic priests

The Freiburg Declaration (Freiburger Erklärung in German) is a June 2012 letter signed by rebel priests from the Roman Catholic Archdiocese of Freiburg calling for change to Catholic law forbidding communion to remarried divorcees. The archbishop for Freiburg, Robert Zollitsch, expressed disapproval of practices contrary to church law and requested that priests refrain from signing the declaration, and to retract any signatures already made.
