= Stephan Burger =

German Roman Catholic clergyman

The Most Reverend Stephan Burger
- Archbishop of Freiburg; Metropolitan of the Upper Rhine Province
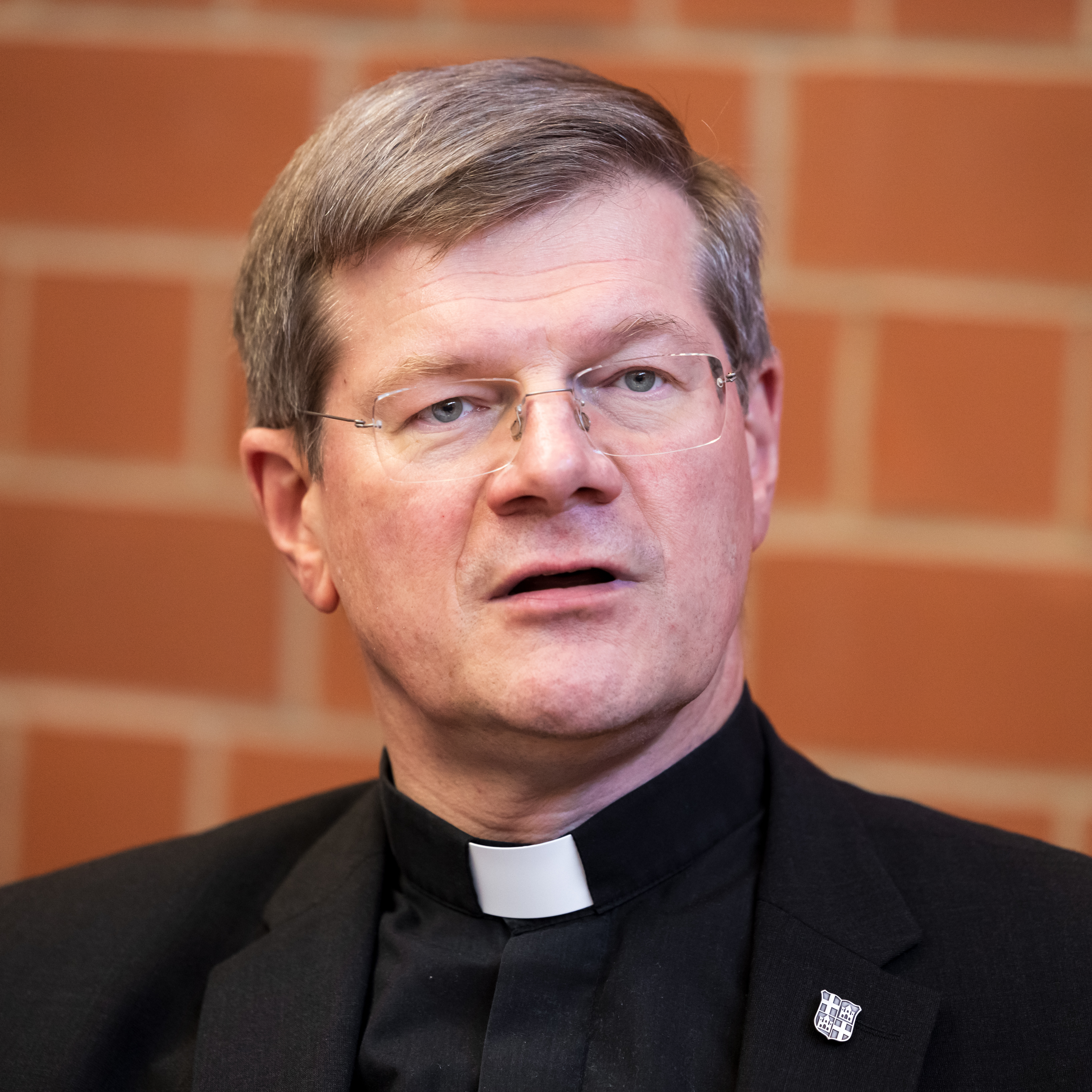
- Burger in 2023
- Church: Roman Catholic Church
- Province: Province of Freiburg
- Diocese: Archdiocese of Freiburg
- Predecessor: Robert Zollitsch

Orders
- Consecration: 29 June 2014 by Karl Lehmann and Gebhard Fürst

Personal details
- Born: Stephan Burger; 29 April 1962 (age 64) Freiburg im Breisgau, West Germany
- Denomination: Roman Catholic Church
- Coat of arms

Stephan Burger (born 29 April 1962 in Freiburg im Breisgau) is a German Roman Catholic clergyman. Since 2014 he has been Archbishop of Freiburg and Metropolitan Bishop of the Ecclesiastical Province of Freiburg.

== Life and career ==
Stephan Burger grew up in Löffingen, West Germany with two brothers and a sister. His brother Tutilo Burger has been archabbot of the benedictines of Beuron Archabbey since 2011.

After going to primary school and middle school (Realschule), he went to boarding school at Immenstaad am Bodensee. He then entered the Collegium Borromaeum at Freiburg, which was then a hall of residence for those students of theology who intended to become priests, and studied philosophy and theology at the University of Freiburg and LMU Munich. On 20 May 1990 he was ordained a priest at Freiburg Minster and celebrated his first mass at St Michael's church in Löffingen. Burger spent his first years as a priest at Tauberbischofsheim and Pforzheim. In 1995, he was first parish administrator and later parish priest of St Mauritius in Sankt Leon-Rot. Between 2004 and 2006, while continuing to work as a parish priest, he studied for a licentiate of Canon Law at the University of Münster.

Starting 2002, Burger worked as defender of the bond (defensor vinculi) at the officialate (diocesan tribunal) of the Archdiocese of Freiburg. In 2006, he became promotor iustitiae and in 2007, was appointed judicial vicar and leader of the diocesan court. In this function he supervised the process of beatification for Max Josef Metzger. He was a canon of the Archdiocese of Freiburg between 2013 and 2014.

=== Archbishop of Freiburg ===
On 30 May 2014, Pope Francis appointed Burger to succeed Robert Zollitsch as Archbishop of Freiburg. He received his episcopal consecration from his predecessor Robert Zollitsch in Freiburg Minster on 29 June 2014. The co-consecrators were Cardinal Karl Lehmann, Bishop of Mainz, and Gebhard Fürst, Bishop of Rottenburg-Stuttgart. Burger chose Christus in cordibus ("Christ in the hearts") from the Letter of St Paul to the Ephesians (Eph 3:17) as his episcopal motto.

His predecessor Robert Zollitsch called Burger "conservative in a good sense" during his introduction.

During the autumn 2014 assembly of the German Bishops' Conference, he was made a member of the committee Weltkirche (Universal Church), president of the sub-committee for questions of development and the German episcopal charity Misereor, and member of the episcopal working committee for employment law. Since 2016, Burger is also president of the committee for Caritas, the German Catholic Relief Services.

== Views and exercise of office (in selection) ==
Burger said in an April 2019 interview that abolishing the mandatory celibacy requirement for Catholic priests is possible under church law. The pope, as the Roman Catholic Church's supreme legislator, could change that, he said. However, he himself supports the celibacy of priests.

In a discussion evening with young Catholics in July 2021, which was broadcast publicly as a streaming video, Burger took a negative position against the ordination of women to the priesthood. He said, he personally has a hard time with that idea.

In 2018, Burger had rejected the ecclesiastical blessing of same-sex couples for the Archdiocese of Freiburg. In his view, refusing the sacrament of marriage or ecclesiastical blessings in such cases does not constitute discrimination against same-sex couples.

During Archbishop Burger's term of office respectiveley under his leadership, the 2022/2023 budget plan adopted at the end of 2021 classified the personnel at the management level of the Archdiocese of Freiburg in higher salary groups (in addition to the regular basic salary increases). The corresponding salaries were increased by up to ten percent or more by the higher salary groups, while the salary of the Archbishop himself was increased by just under six percent (upgrade from salary group B8 to B9). The procedure and the amount of the salary increases met with criticism, also in view of the sharp decline in membership and in the available financial resources of the archdiocese. The lack of involvement of bodies such as the church tax committee and the church tax representatives in the run-up to the reclassification was criticized. Georg Bier, Professor of Canon Law at the University of Freiburg, criticized that the archdiocese's approach contradicted the concept of salaries in the civil service and in the church service in Germany: a higher salary grade is generally only awarded if it is associated with a new function with new, more responsible tasks.

== Honours ==
Stephan Burger is an honorary member of the Catholic student's association K.D.St.V. Wildenstein at Freiburg.

In 2016, he has been appointed Knight Commander with Star of the Order of the Holy Sepulchre by Cardinal Edwin Frederick O'Brien, Grand Master of the Order, and was invested in Münster Cathedral on 21 May 2016 by Cardinal Reinhard Marx, Grand Prior of the German Lieutenancy of the Order. Burger is member of the Delegation Albertus Magnus Freiburg.

On 18 June 2016, Burger was appointed Conventual Chaplain ad honorem of the Sovereign Military Order of Malta during the general assembly of the German national association.

Catholic Church titles
Preceded by Robert Zollitsch	Archbishop of Freiburg; 2014–present	Incumbent
