= Wendelin Rauch =

- Archbishop of Freiburg im Breisgau
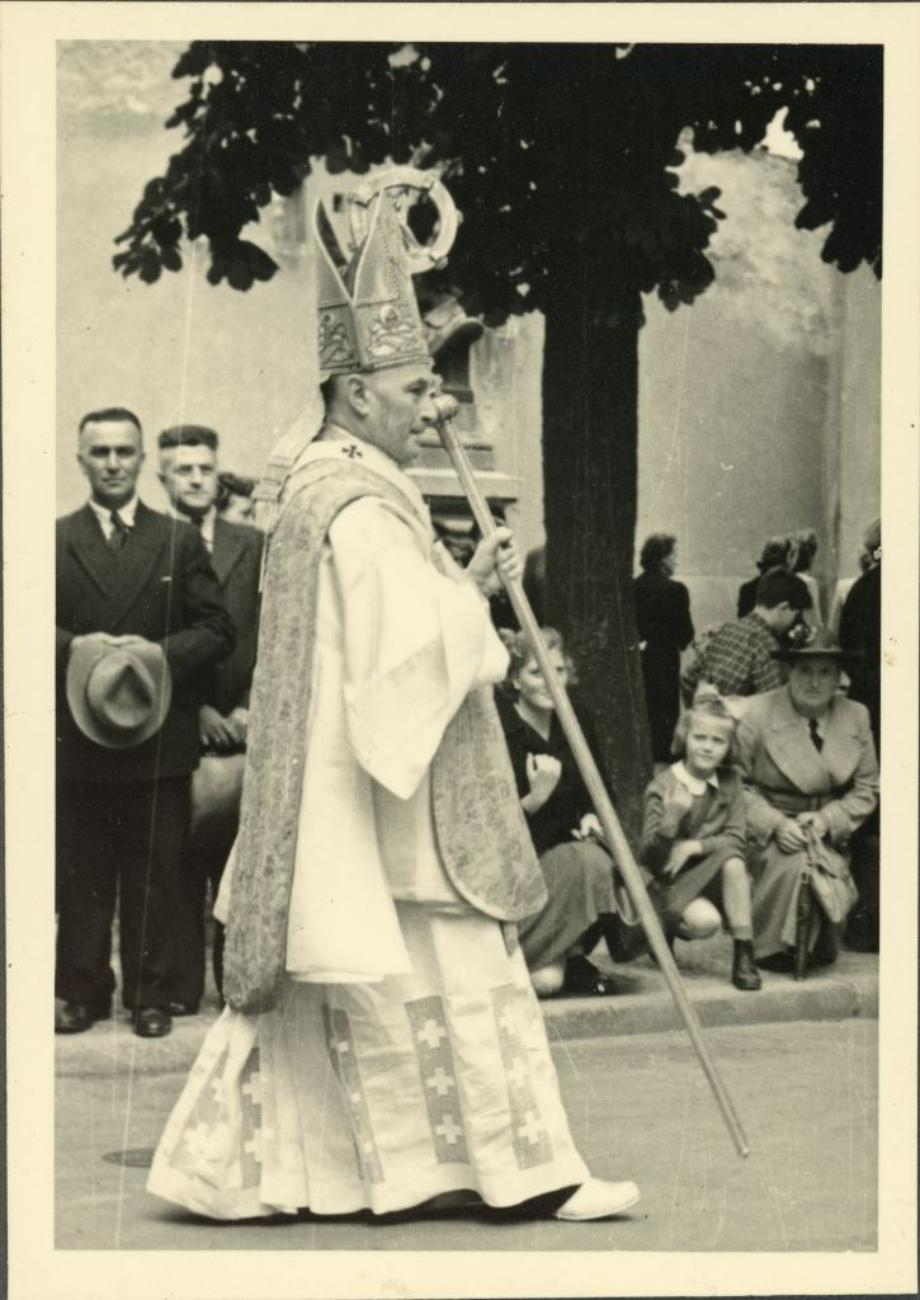
- Wendelin Rauch c. 1950
- Church: Catholic Church
- Archdiocese: Archdiocese of Freiburg im Breisgau
- In office: 27 August 1948 – 28 April 1954
- Predecessor: Conrad Gröber
- Successor: Eugen Seiterich

Orders
- Ordination: 28 October 1910
- Consecration: 28 October 1948 by Josef Frings

Personal details
- Born: 30 August 1885 Zell am Andelsbach (near Pfullendorf), Grand Duchy of Baden, German Empire
- Died: 28 April 1954 (aged 68) Freiburg im Breisgau, Baden-Württemberg, West Germany
- Coat of arms

Wendelin Rauch (30 August 1885 – 28 April 1954) was a German Roman Catholic clergyman.

Rauch was born in Zell am Andelsbach. He served as archbishop of Freiburg from 1948 until his death at Freiburg im Breisgau, aged 68.

Catholic Church titles
Preceded by Conrad Gröber	Archbishop of Freiburg; 1948–1954	Succeeded by Eugen Seiterich
