= Max Josef Metzger =

German priest and martyr (1887–1944)

Blessed Max Josef Metzger
- 1887 – 1944
- Born: 3 February 1887; Schopfheim, Baden, Germany
- Died: 17 April 1944 (aged 57); Brandenburg-Görden Prison, Brandenburg an der Havel, Germany
- Beatified: 17 November 2024, Freiburg Minster, Germany by Cardinal Kurt Koch
- Feast: 17 April
- Influenced: Thomas Merton

Max Josef Metzger (3 February 1887 – 17 April 1944) was a Catholic priest and leading German pacifist. Due to his activities for peace between nations, Metzger was a thorn in the side of the National Socialists. After being arrested several times, Max Josef Metzger was executed in Brandenburg-Görden Prison in 1944. He was beatified by the Catholic Church in 2024.

== Life ==
=== Early life and education ===
Born on 3 February 1887, in Schopfheim in Baden, Germany, Metzger studied first at the lycee in Konstanz, where Martin Heidegger was also a student. Here Metzger gave a lecture on the "History of the Monastery at Reichenau". As a student, Metzger likely lived at Saint Conrad, a student residence established by the archbishop of Freiburg to provide religious training for those preparing for Holy Orders. One of the highly regarded professors at the lycee was an instructor by the name of Pacius, a democrat and pacifist who taught modern languages.

Metzger then attended the University of Freiburg im Breisgau and then at the University of Fribourg in Switzerland, where he earned a doctorate in theology.

=== Work ===
In 1911 he was ordained a Roman Catholic priest, and was sent to parish work in the Archdiocese of Freiburg, since he definitely didn't want to pursue a scientific career. "My object is not to become a scholar, nor ... to obtain an honorable or pleasant position one day, but only to become a pious priest and capable pastor and to be able to develop all my powers for the glory of God", he stated.

Metzger served as a military chaplain for the forces of Imperial Germany during World War I. It is still unclear what motivated him to do this. He was awarded the Iron Cross on 6 May 1915, and honorably discharged because of ill health in October 1915, when he got pneumonia and pleurisy. His experience on the front lines convinced him that "future wars have lost their meaning, since they no longer give anybody the prospect of winning more than he loses".

With the permission of his local bishop Metzger moved to Graz, where he heard lectures on law and political science. In 1916 he published Frieden auf Erden ("Peace on Earth"), a pamphlet urging an end to war. He became secretary to the Catholic League of the Cross of Austria, an organization involved in educating people about the dangers of alcoholism. In 1918 he established the mission society of the "White Cross" a community, whose members strived for a life following the evangelical counsels. However, Metzger was not in a position to obtain episcopal recognition for the about 20 members.

Metzger was also involved in establishing the German Catholics’ Peace Association which used Esperanto in its international contacts from 1918. In 1920 Metzger founded "Internacio Katolika" (IKA). From 1921 to 1924 Metzger edited the Esperanto magazine, Katolika Mondo (Catholic World), in Graz.

In 1920 Metzger was admitted to a private audience with Pope Benedict XV, who encouraged him to work for disarmament in Europe. Strongly advocating the ecumenical idea of peace Metzger soon became known as a leading German pacifist and Esperantist.

The foundation of numerous associations brought Metzger into conflict with the ordinariate in Graz who were particularly offended by the fact that he had undertaken these foundations without official permission and by Metzger's alleged "closeness to communism". Due to the conflict, Metzger eventually left Styria in 1927. He re-located to Meiningen in Germany, where he and the community, now called the Society of Christ the King, had been invited to staff and manage the Catholic Charities facility.

In 1938, Metzger founded the brotherhood Una Sancta, a group devoted to the re-unification of Roman Catholics and Lutherans.

=== Arrests, trial and martyrdom ===
After the rise to power of German dictator Adolf Hitler in 1933, Metzger was arrested several times by the Gestapo, for the first time for three days in January 1934. A second arrest for four weeks was in connection with the Munich assassination attempt on Hitler. Metzger then moved from Meitingen near Augsburg to Berlin, in order to avoid his persecutors. He lived and worked in St. Joseph, Wedding from 1939 until his last arrest in 1943.

In 1942, Metzger wrote a letter to Hitler in which he asked Hitler to step down, but he did not send it on the advice of his friends. In 1943, Metzger wrote a memorandum on the reorganization of the German state and its integration into a future system of world peace. When he tried to have this memorandum delivered to the Archbishop of Uppsala, Erling Eidem, Metzger was denounced by the courier. Metzger's memorandum never reached Uppsala. The courier was a female Gestapo agent, Swedish-born Dagmar Imgart, and Metzger was arrested on 29 June 1943.

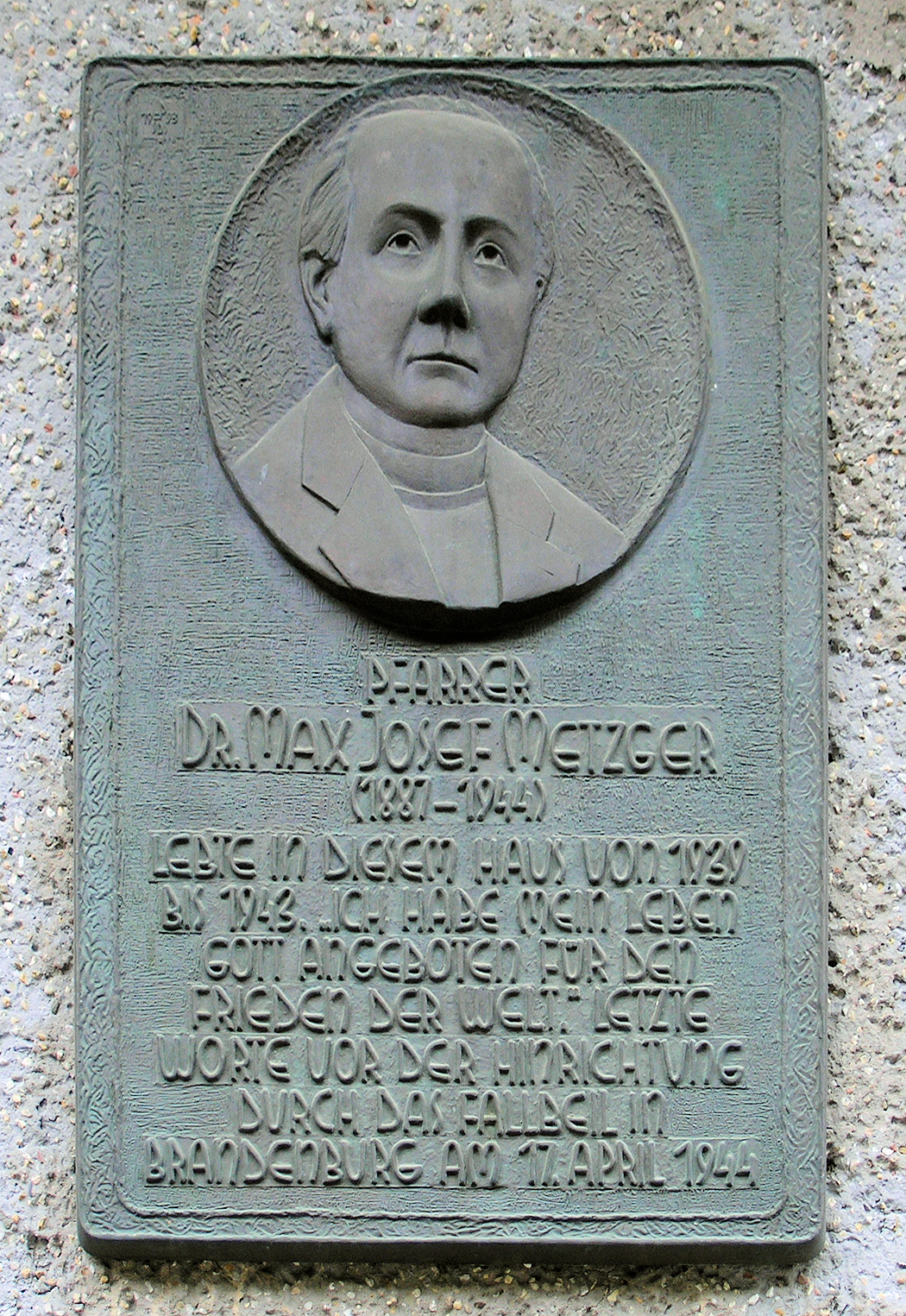
Memorial plaque for Max Josef Metzger in Wedding, with the inscription of his last words

Metzger was tried by the German People's Court in a show trial that lasted just 70 minutes. The President of the court, Roland Freisler – who had already completed three proceedings that day – refused to hear the defendant. He declared that "such a plague had to be eradicated". Metzger was sentenced to death for "high treason and favoring the enemy" and was executed after some months in the death row on 17 April 1944 in Brandenburg-Görden Prison. Just before his execution he said: Ich habe mein Leben Gott angeboten für den Frieden der Welt und die Einheit der Kirchen ("I offered my life to God for the peace of the world and the unity of the churches").

The then bishop of Freiburg, Conrad Gröber, did not try to shelter Metzger, but called him a misguided idealist. Bishop Gröber subsequently apologized to Freisler and lamented "most deeply the offense of which he has made himself guilty".

In 1997, the Landgericht Berlin posthumously overturned the death sentence.

== Beatification ==
The Catholic Church regards Max Josef Metzger as a martyr. On 8 May 2006, the beatification process for Metzger was opened by the Archbishop of Freiburg, Robert Zollitsch. In March 2014, the first part of the process was completed when the documents were handed over to the Dicastery for the Causes of Saints. On 14 March 2024, the Dicastery announced that it recognises the murder of the priest from Schopfheim by the National Socialists as a martyr's death, thus clearing the way for the beatification of Metzger in the near future.

The beatification of Max Josef Metzger was celebrated on 17 November in Freiburg Minster by Cardinal Kurt Koch on behalf of Pope Francis. Metzger's feast day in the liturgical calendar is 17 April.

== Legacy ==
The American Trappist monk Thomas Merton was influenced by the life of Max Josef Metzger. In his essay A Martyr for Peace and Unity, Merton cites Metzger's example in dying for peace. In protesting Hitler's abuse of power, Metzger wrote that "it is honorable to die for one's country, but still more honorable to die for righteousness and peace". Merton, in turn, wrote: "To question those who wield power, to differ from them in any way, is to confess oneself subversive, rebellious, traitorous. Father Metzger did not believe in power, in bombs. He believed in Christ, in unity, in peace. He died as a martyr for his belief."

Max Josef Metzger wrote numerous poems and prayers. In 2019, the American composer Cormac Brian O’Duffy set the poems Metzger wrote in prison to music as a Metzger oratorio.

There is a Max-Josef-Metzger-Platz (in front of St. Joseph) in Berlin, and also four plaques made of steel with some words in Esperanto. There was also a Stolperstein laid in front of the house Müllerstraße 161 as well as one at Karmeliterplatz in Graz, where the "White Cross" was located.

== See also ==
- Catholic Church and Nazi Germany
