= Karl Fritz =

- Archbishop of Freiburg im Breisgau
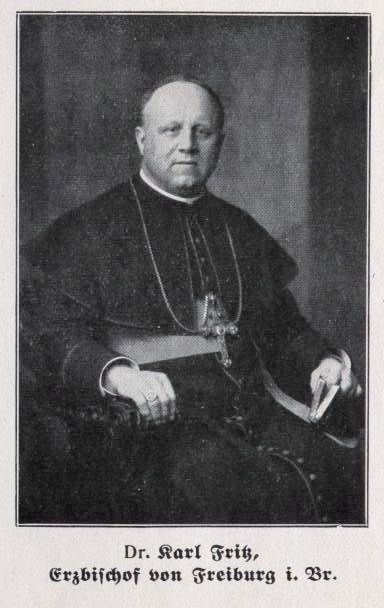
- Fritz in 1922
- Church: Catholic Church
- Archdiocese: Archdiocese of Freiburg im Breisgau
- In office: 12 October 1920 – 7 December 1931
- Predecessor: Thomas Nörber
- Successor: Conrad Gröber

Orders
- Ordination: 12 July 1888
- Consecration: 28 October 1920 by Paul Wilhelm von Keppler

Personal details
- Born: 20 August 1864 Adelhausen, Rheinfelden, Grand Duchy of Baden, German Confederation
- Died: 7 December 1931 (aged 67) Freiburg im Breisgau, Republic of Baden, German Reich
- Coat of arms

Karl or Carl Fritz (20 August 1864 in Adelhausen – 7 December 1931 in Freiburg im Breisgau) was a German Roman Catholic clergyman. From 28 October 1920 until his death he served as Archbishop of Freiburg.

== Bibliography (in German) ==
- Dr. Karl Fritz, Erzbischof von Freiburg, Freiburg: Herder & Co., 1922 (Gedenkblatt).
- Zur feierlichen Konsekration der St. Peters-Kirche in Mannheim: am Feste Peter und Paul 29. Juni 1930 durch Se. Exzellenz, den Hochwürdigsten Herrn Erzbischof Dr. Carl Fritz, hrsg. im Auftrag der Pfarrkuratie St. Peter, Karlsruhe: Dt. Tiefdruckverl., 1930.
- Gebete und Gesänge bei dem Trauergottesdienst und bei der Beisetzung Seiner Exzellenz des Hochwürdigsten Herrn Erzbischofs Dr. Carl Fritz, 15. Dez. 1931 in der Metropolitankirche zu Freiburg im Breisgau, Freiburg i. Br.: Herder, 1931.
- Wolfgang Müller (1961). "Fritz, Carl". Neue Deutsche Biographie (in German). Vol. 5. Berlin: Duncker & Humblot. pp. 631–632. (full text online).
- Hugo Ott: Das aufkommende Industriezeitalter und die kirchliche Sozialpolitik in Baden um die Jahrhundertwende. Der Fall St. Blasien und Bernau., Kapitel: Karl Fritz „sozialistischer“ Pfarrer in Bernau und seit 1920 Erzbischof von Freiburg. In: Auftrag und Dienst: 60 Jahre Caritasverband Freiburg, Freiburg 1986, S. 18–29.
- Christoph Schmider: Die Freiburger Bischöfe: 175 Jahre Erzbistum Freiburg. Eine Geschichte in Lebensbildern. Freiburg i. Br.: Herder Verlag, 2002. ISBN 3-451-27847-2.

== Sources ==
- David M. Cheney. "Archbishop Karl Fritz [Catholic-Hierarchy]". catholic-hierarchy.org. ^{[self-published]}

Catholic Church titles
Preceded by Thomas Nörber	Archbishop of Freiburg; 1920–1931	Succeeded by Conrad Gröber
