= Thomas Nörber =

- Archbishop of Freiburg im Breisgau
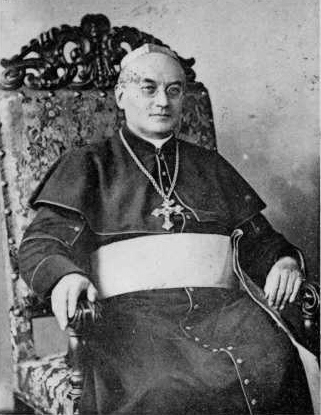
- Nörber by Wilhelm Kuntzemüller
- Church: Catholic Church
- Archdiocese: Archdiocese of Freiburg im Breisgau
- In office: 5 September 1898 – 27 July 1920
- Predecessor: Georg Ignaz Komp
- Successor: Karl Fritz

Orders
- Ordination: 24 July 1870
- Consecration: 29 September 1898 by Paul Leopold Haffner

Personal details
- Born: 19 December 1846 Waldstetten, Kingdom of Württemberg, German Confederation
- Died: 27 July 1920 (aged 73) Freiburg im Breisgau, Republic of Baden, German Reich
- Coat of arms

Thomas Nörber (19 December 1846 in Waldstetten – 27 July 1920 in Freiburg im Breisgau) was a German Roman Catholic clergyman. From 1898 until his death he served as Archbishop of Freiburg.

== Sources ==
- David M. Cheney. "Archbishop Thomas Nörber [Catholic-Hierarchy]". catholic-hierarchy.org.

Catholic Church titles
Preceded by Georg Ignaz Komp	Archbishop of Freiburg; 1898–1920	Succeeded by Karl Fritz
