= Eugen Seiterich =

- Archbishop of Freiburg im Breisgau
- Church: Catholic Church
- Archdiocese: Archdiocese of Freiburg im Breisgau
- In office: 7 August 1954 – 3 March 1958
- Predecessor: Wendelin Rauch
- Successor: Hermann Schäufele
- Previous posts: Titular Bishop of Binda (1952-1954); Auxiliary Bishop of Freiburg im Breisgau (1952-1954)

Orders
- Ordination: 19 March 1926
- Consecration: 3 September 1952 by Wendelin Rauch

Personal details
- Born: Eugen Viktor Paul Seiterich; 9 January 1903 Karlsruhe, Grand Duchy of Baden, German Empire
- Died: 3 March 1958 (aged 55) Freiburg im Breisgau, Baden-Württemberg, West Germany
- Coat of arms

Eugen Viktor Paul Seiterich (9 January 1903 in Karlsruhe – 3 March 1958 in Freiburg im Breisgau) was a German Roman Catholic clergyman who served as archbishop of Freiburg from 1954 until his death.

== Sources ==
- Literature by and about Eugen Seiterich in the German National Library catalogue
- "bishop/bseit". Catholic-Hierarchy.org. David M. Cheney. ^{[self-published]}
- Albert Raffelt: Bibliographie, Freiburg i. Br. 1997 (after F. Beutter 1959)

Catholic Church titles
Preceded by Wendelin Rauch	Archbishop of Freiburg; 1954–1958	Succeeded by Hermann Schäufele
