= Binda =

Binda may refer to:

- Binda, New South Wales, village in New South Wales, Australia.
- Binda (titular see), an ancient Roman Catholic bishopric in present-day Turkey
- Bindaios, the town hosting the see
- Binda Group, a watch and jewelry company

== People ==
- Albino Binda (1904–1976), Italian racing cyclist
- Alfredo Binda (1902–1986), Italian cyclist of the 1920s and 1930s
- Marie Beatrice Binda, known as Mademoiselle Beatrice (1839–1878), Italian-born actress in England

== See also ==
- Trofeo Alfredo Binda-Comune di Cittiglio, a women's professional road bicycle racing event
