= Margarete Sommer =

German Catholic social worker and lay Dominican (1893-1965)

Margarete Sommer TOSD
- Born: 21 July 1893; Berlin, German Empire
- Died: 30 June 1965 (aged 71); West Berlin, West Germany
- Occupation: Social worker

Margarete (Grete) Sommer (July 21, 1893 – June 30, 1965) was a German Catholic social worker and lay Dominican. During the Holocaust, she helped keep many Jews from deportation to death camps.

== Biography ==
Margarete Sommer was born in Berlin's Schöneweide neighbourhood in 1893. Her father was a railroad administrator. At the age of 19, she passed the exam as a primary school teacher and studied economics with a focus on social policy at the University of Berlin. Her studies also included philosophy, history and law in Heidelberg and Berlin. At the outbreak of the First World War, she worked as an auxiliary nurse in Maria-Viktoria Hospital of the Dominican Sisters. She joined the Third Order Dominicans and was active in a Catholic Students Association. In 1924 she became one of the few women of her generation to be awarded a doctoral degree. Sommer worked as an instructor at various welfare colleges. From 1927 she taught at the Social Welfare Institute of Pestalozzi-Fröbel House in Berlin, a charity that adhered to the ideas of liberal social reformer Alice Salomon. She was friends with Dominican Father Francis Stratmann, who was arrested in 1933 for preaching against Nazism and anti-Semitism. In 1934 Sommer was forced to resign for refusing to teach her classes the Nazi policy of the compulsory sterilization of disabled people. Now unemployed, she gave up her apartment in Berlin and moved with her mother and sister in Kleinmachnow on the outskirts of the city.

Following her dismissal from Pestalozzi, Sommer found work with various Catholic agencies who helped "non-Aryan" Christians emigrate from the Third Reich. In 1935, on Sommer took up a position at the Episcopal Diocesan Authority in Berlin, counseling victims of racial persecution with the Catholic aid agency, Caritas Emergency Relief. In 1939 she became diocesan instructor for the ministry for women.

== Hilfswerk ==
From 1939 she became increasingly active in the Welfare Office of the Berlin Diocesan Authority ("Hilfswerk"), and in 1941 she became managing director under the Cathedral Provost Bernhard Lichtenberg. Lichtenberg was a noted anti-Nazi resistor, who was under the watch of the Gestapo for his courageous support of prisoners and Jews, and who was arrested in 1941 and died en route to Dachau in 1943. After this, Sommer took operational charge of the agency, reporting to Bishop Konrad von Preysing. Presying was one of the leading Catholic voices against Nazism in Germany. Her employees called her "the Sommerin".

In theory non-Aryan Christians were to be supported by the "Fund". In fact, the aid was provided to every Jewish citizen who contacted the Ordinariate. At first the focus was housing and employment for the disenfranchised or for assistance in emigrating abroad. Some 120 Jewish families were supported with tens of thousands of Reichsmarks from the office. The "Fund" had to take care of daily needs such as food cards, rent, doctors and dental treatment or took over the costs of prostheses. When Jews later no longer allowed to either work nor emigrate, the agency procured food, clothing, medicines and money. After 1941 the main task was to save Jewish lives. Monsignor Horst Roth described Margarete Sommer as a "wise, resolute woman", who found hiding places for two men in the crypt of the Sacred Heart Church.

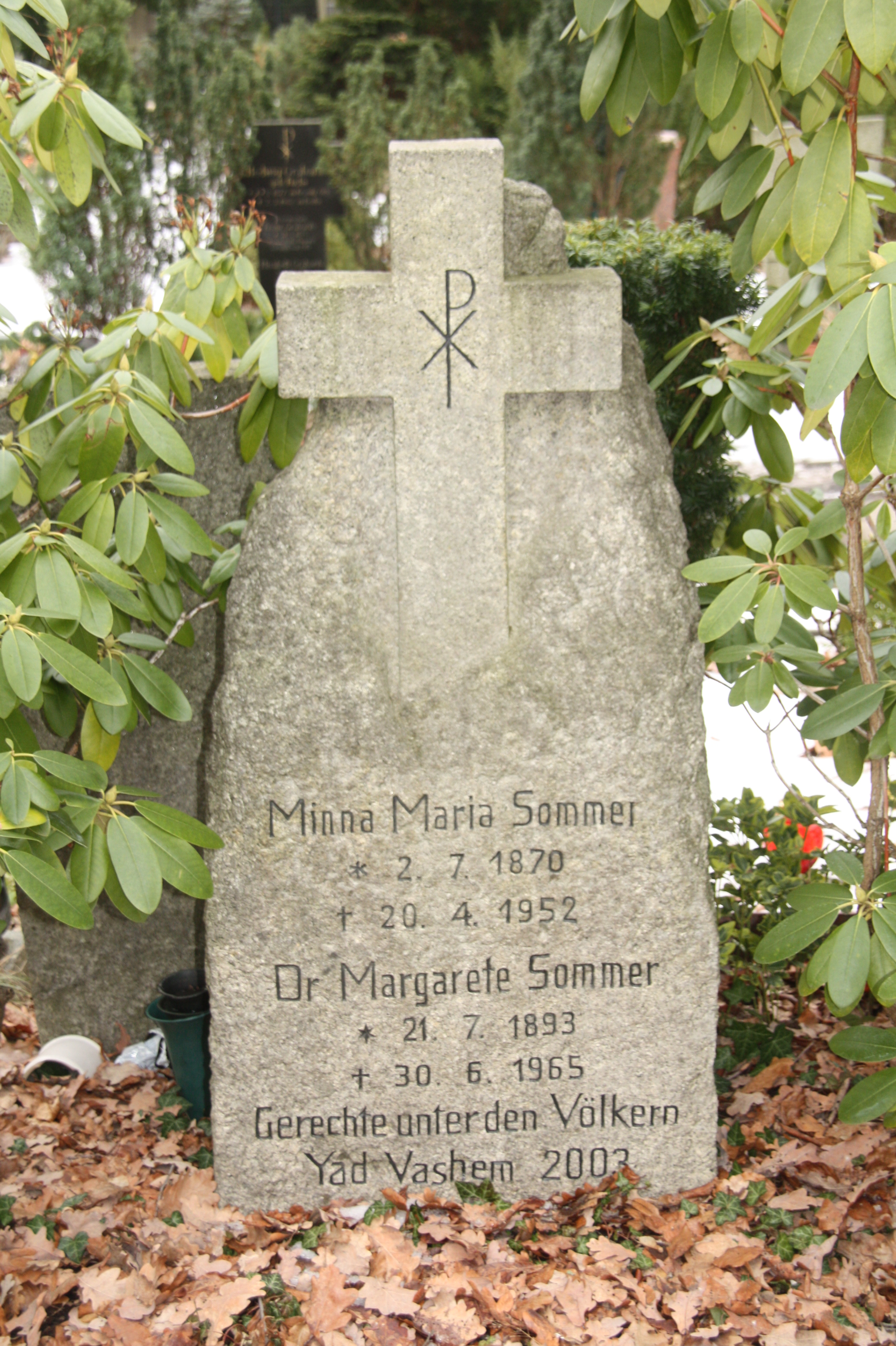
Grave at St Matthias cemetery in Berlin-Tempelhof

While working for the Welfare Office of the Berlin Diocesan Authority, Sommer coordinated Catholic aid for victims of racial persecution, giving them spiritual comfort, food, clothing, and money. She corresponded with churchmen and ministers in England and USA, Central America and even in China to seek exit opportunities for her clients. Sommer used her expertise and connections to various government offices to monitor the advance of the "final solution". She managed to get access to deportation lists and helped many by finding them hiding or exit opportunities. From her home in Kleinmachnow she organized relief supplies from relatives of those interned in Sachsenhausen.

She also gathered intelligence on the deportations of the Jews, and living conditions in concentration camps, as well as on SS firing squads, writing several reports on these topics from 1942, including an August 1942 report which reached Rome under the title "Report on the Exodus of the Jews". In 1943 Sommer and Preysing drafted a statement for the German Bishops which would have actually rebuked Hitler for human rights abuses and mass murder. The draft began, "With deepest sorrow--yes even with holy indignation--have we German bishops learned of the deportation of non-Aryans in a manner that is scornful of all human rights. It is our holy duty to defend the unalienable rights of all men guaranteed by natural law." The end of the draft chided Hitler on the very issue of genocide: "We would not want to omit to say that meeting these previously mentioned stipulations would be the most certain way to deflate the crescendo of rumors regarding the mass death of the deported non-Aryans." The statement was not issued on the basis that it had already been asserted in 1942.

== Post war ==
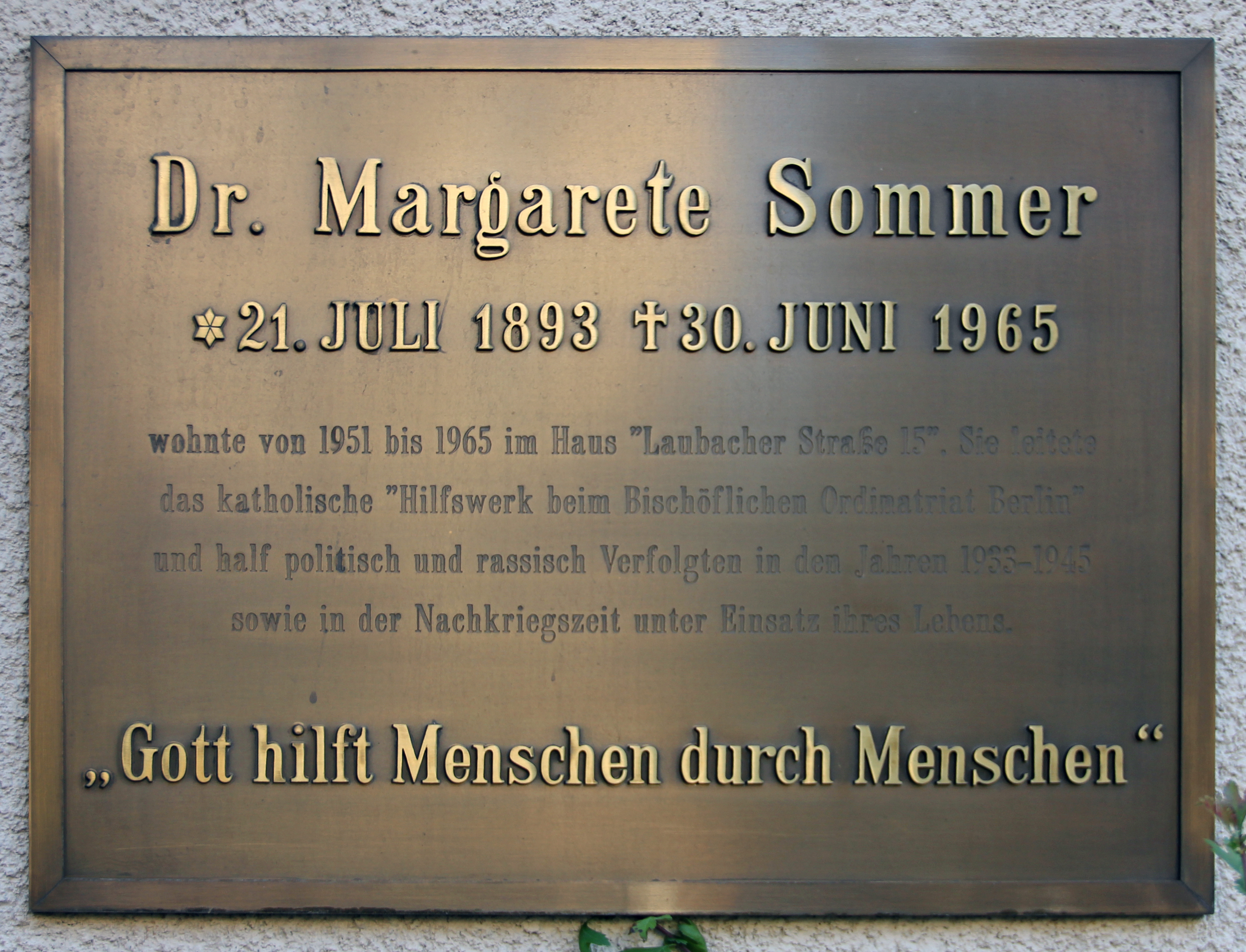
Memorial to Margarete Sommer

After the war Sommer's residence in Kleinmachnow was in the Soviet occupation zone on the border of what was then West Berlin. Sommer started helping neighbors facing possible deportation to Siberia. She aided many to escape to West Berlin until she was forced to literally leave the newly founded GDR under cover of darkness in 1950. Sommer continued her work at the Episcopal Diocesan Authority in Berlin, assisting survivors of Nazi persecution.

In 1946 she was awarded the Order of Merit Pro Ecclesia et Pontifice. In 1949 she became a member of the Community for Christian-Jewish Cooperation. In 1952 she was assigned to work in the refugee ministry.

In 1953 Margarete Sommer was awarded the Federal Cross of Merit First Class. She died on June 30, 1965, in West Berlin.

== Legacy ==
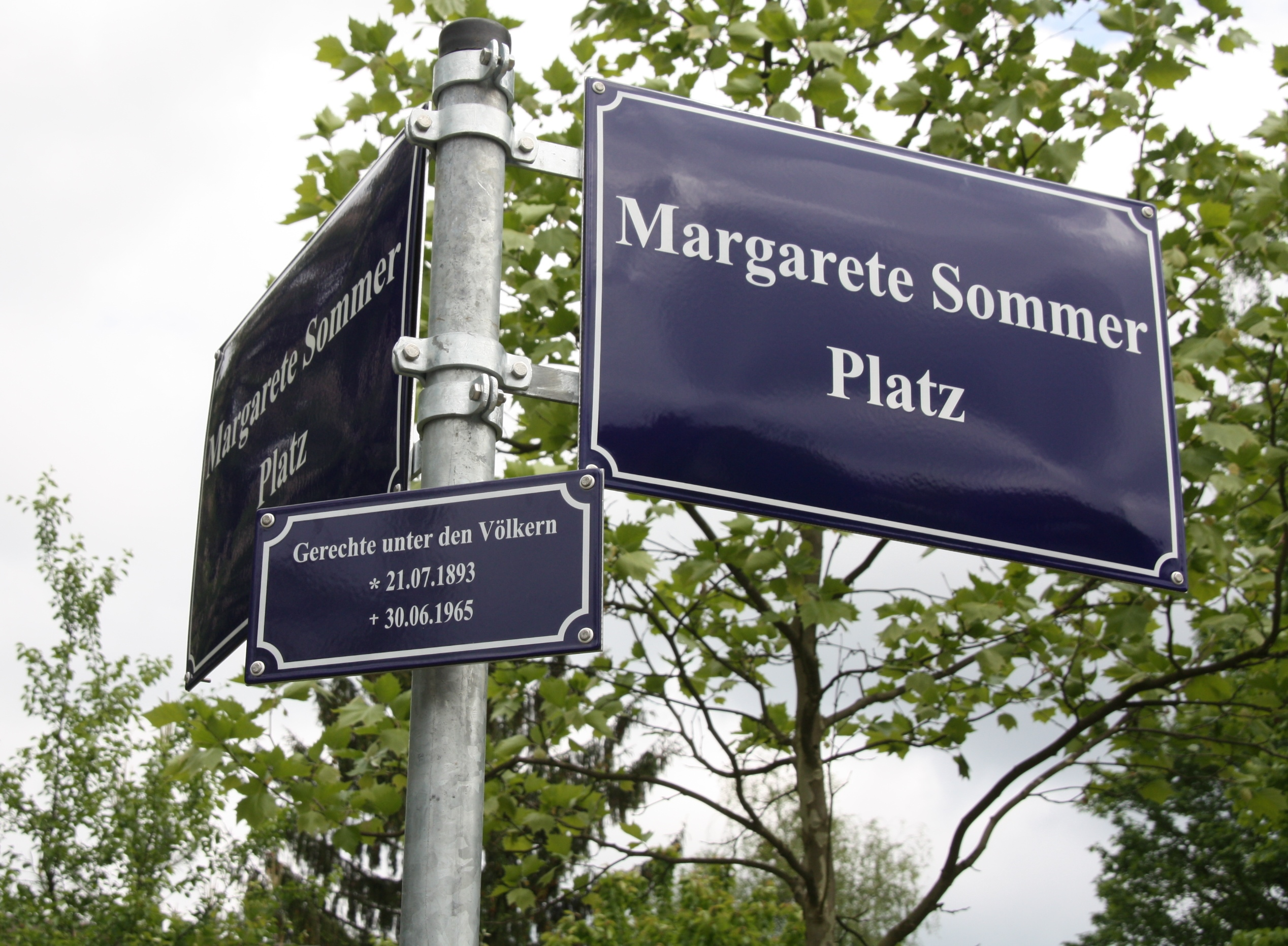
Margarete-Sommer-Platz in Kleinmachnow

Much of Margarete Sommer's activities would have been considered "high treason" in Hitler's Germany. Despite great personal risk Sommer assisted many individuals to either emigrate from the Third Reich or find safe refuge. Detailed records of those rescued were not kept lest the information fall into the hands of the Gestapo. Witnesses recall more than a hundred managed or rescued people. In 2003 Margarete Sommer was posthumously awarded the honorary title of Righteous Among the Nations by Yad Vashem.

Margarete-Sommer-Straße in Berlin is named after her, as is Margarete-Sommer-Platz in Kleinmachnow.

== See also ==
- Gertrud Luckner
