= Oskar Saier =

German Roman Catholic clergyman

- Archbishop of Freiburg im Breisgau
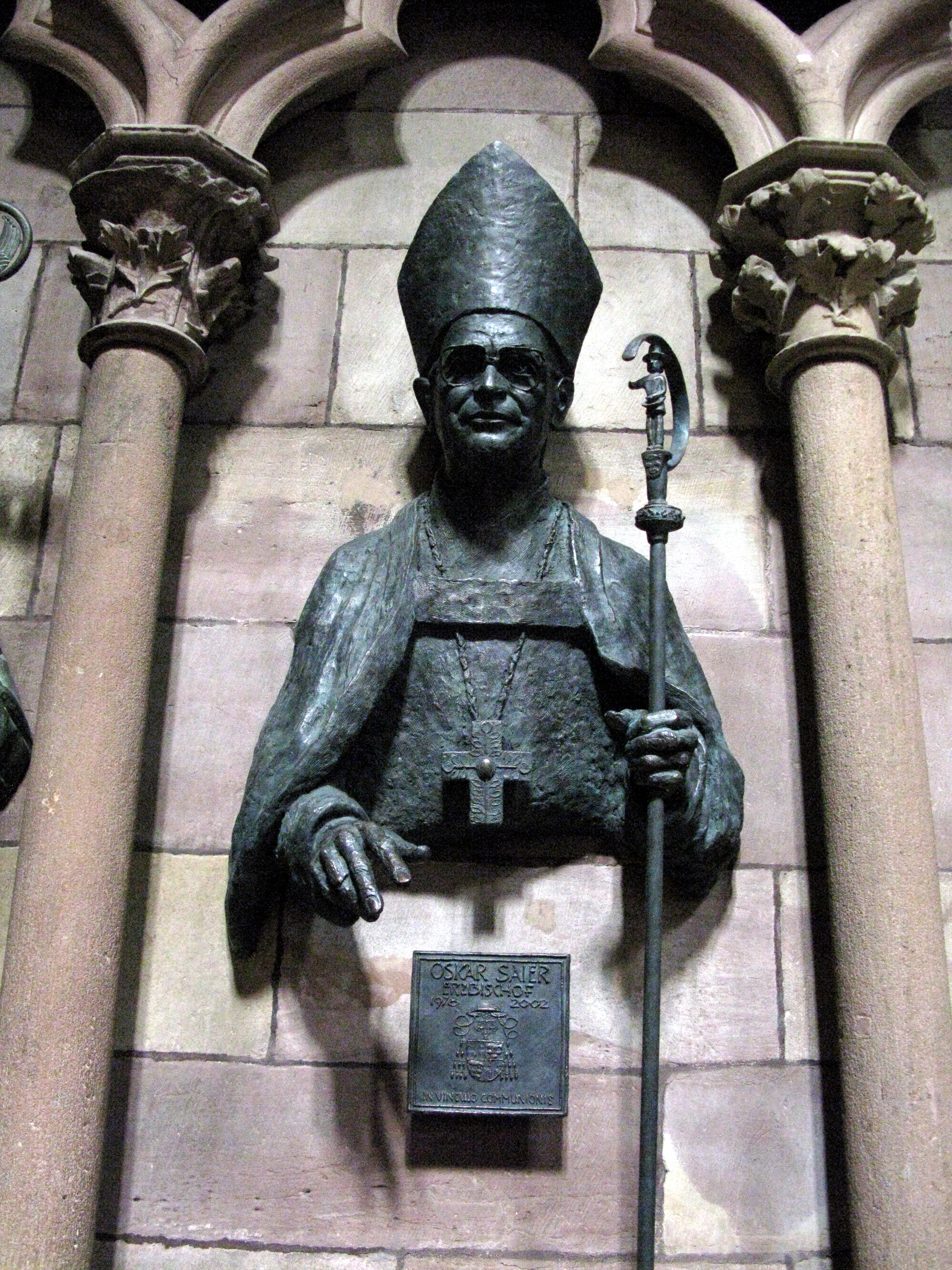
- Church: Catholic Church
- Archdiocese: Archdiocese of Freiburg im Breisgau
- In office: 15 March 1978 – 1 July 2002
- Predecessor: Hermann Schäufele
- Successor: Robert Zollitsch
- Previous posts: Titular Bishop of Rubicon (1972-1978); Auxiliary Bishop of Freiburg im Breisgau (1972-1978)

Orders
- Ordination: 2 June 1957
- Consecration: 29 June 1972 by Hermann Schäufele

Personal details
- Born: 12 August 1932 Wagensteig, Buchenbach, Republic of Baden, German Reich
- Died: 3 January 2008 (aged 75) Freiburg im Breisgau, Baden-Württemberg, Germany
- Coat of arms

Oskar Saier (12 August 1932 in Wagensteig – 3 January 2008 in Freiburg im Breisgau) was a German Roman Catholic clergyman who served as archbishop of Freiburg from 1978 until 2002.

== Works ==
- "Communio" in der Lehre des Zweiten Vatikanischen Konzils. Eine rechtsbegriffliche Untersuchung (= Münchener theologische Studien, 3, Kanonistische Abteilung, file 32), Verlag Hueber, Ismaning 1973, (also doctoral thesis, Munich, Faculty of Theology, 1970).

== Bibliography ==
- Christoph Schmider, Die Freiburger Bischöfe. 175 Jahre Erzbistum Freiburg. Eine Geschichte in Lebensbildern. Herder Verlag, Freiburg i. Br. 2002, ISBN 3-451-27847-2.

== Sources ==
- Literature by and about Oskar Saier in the German National Library catalogue
- "bishop/bsaier". Catholic-Hierarchy.org. David M. Cheney. ^{[self-published]}
- Life of Oskar Saier (Freiburg Ordinariate)

Catholic Church titles
Preceded by Hermann Schäufele	Archbishop of Freiburg; 1978–2002	Succeeded by Robert Zollitsch
