= German Catholics' Peace Association =

German organisation

The German Catholics' Peace Association (Friedensbund Deutscher Katholiken) was a Catholic peace association founded in Weimar Germany in 1919 by Blessed Max Josef Metzger, a Roman Catholic priest.

Metzger had served as a military chaplain in the German Imperial Army during World War I. Metzger became convinced that “future wars have lost their meaning, since they no longer give anybody the prospect of winning more than he loses.” At war's end, Metzger established the German Catholics’ Peace Association. He sought links to the international pacifist movement, strongly advocated the ecumenical idea of peace, and soon became known as a leading German pacifist.

Metzger was targeted by the Nazi authorities and arrested on several occasions by the Gestapo. He was arrested for the last time in June 1943 after being denounced by a mail courier for attempting to send a memorandum on the reorganisation of the German state and its integration into a future system of world peace to Erling Eidem, the Swedish Archbishop of Uppsala. Sentenced to death, he was executed on April 17, 1944. Social worker Gertrud Luckner was another high-profile member of the Association. For her work aiding Nazi victims including the Jews and foreign prisoners of war, Luckner was arrested in 1943 and only narrowly escaped death in the concentration camps.

== See also ==
- Catholic Church and Nazi Germany
- Catholic resistance to Nazism
