= Gertrud Luckner =

German social worker(1900–1995)

- Born: Jane Hartmann; 26 September 1900
- Died: 31 August 1995 (aged 94)

Gertrud Luckner (German: [ˈɡɛʁ.tʁuːt ˈlʊk.nɐ]; born Jane Hartmann; 26 September 1900 – 31 August 1995) was a Christian social worker involved in the German resistance to Nazism.

A member of the banned German Catholics' Peace Association, she organised food packages for Jews deported to Poland and travelled in Germany to give assistance to Jewish families. On one such journey, she was arrested, and she spent the remainder of the war in Ravensbrück concentration camp. She was named as righteous among the Nations by Yad Vashem in 1966.

== Early life and education ==
Born Jane Hartmann in Liverpool, England, on 26 September 1900 to Robert Hartman, a marine engineer, and his wife Gertrude (née Miller). The family lived at 116 Salisbury Road, Wavertree, Liverpool. Her parents were from Germany and returned there when she was still a young child. She had no siblings and was orphaned in early childhood. At the age of seven she was sent to foster parents, who changed her name to Gertrud Luckner. In the 1920s, she returned to England to study at Woodbrooke, the Quaker college in Birmingham. During the holidays, she worked in the slums as a hospital almoner.

She also studied at Königsberg and at the Universities of Frankfurt and Freiburg, where she obtained her doctorate in 1938. Her dissertation was on "Self-help Among the Unemployed in England and in Wales Based on English History of Ideas and Economics."

== Social work and resistance to Nazism ==
Upon the death of her adoptive parents, Gertrud moved to Freiburg im Breisgau. A pacifist, she joined the German Catholics' Peace Association. When the Nazis came to power in 1933, she worked freelance with the Catholic aid organisation Caritas, in Freiburg, where she arranged exit opportunities for Jews. Under the direction of Caritas President Benedict Kreutz, Caritas expanded its activities. Raised a Quaker, in 1934 she was received into the Roman Catholic Church.

Each week, she collected the foreign newspapers discarded by the university library to read the news that was not being reported in German papers. Among German Catholic laity, Luckner was among the first to sense the genocidal inclinations of the Hitler regime and to attempt national action.

After Kristallnacht, on the night of 9 November 1938, when Jewish businesses, synagogues and homes were burned all over Germany, Gertrud cycled around Freiburg and visited Jewish neighbours in friendship and solidarity. Luckner began to work full-time at the head office of the German Association of Catholic Charitable Organizations, "Caritas." Using international contacts, she secured safe passage abroad for many refugees. She organized aid circles for Jews, assisted many to escape, sent food parcels and clothing to internees, founded addresses where Jews could hide and worked with the priests Bernhard Lichtenberg and Alfred Delp.

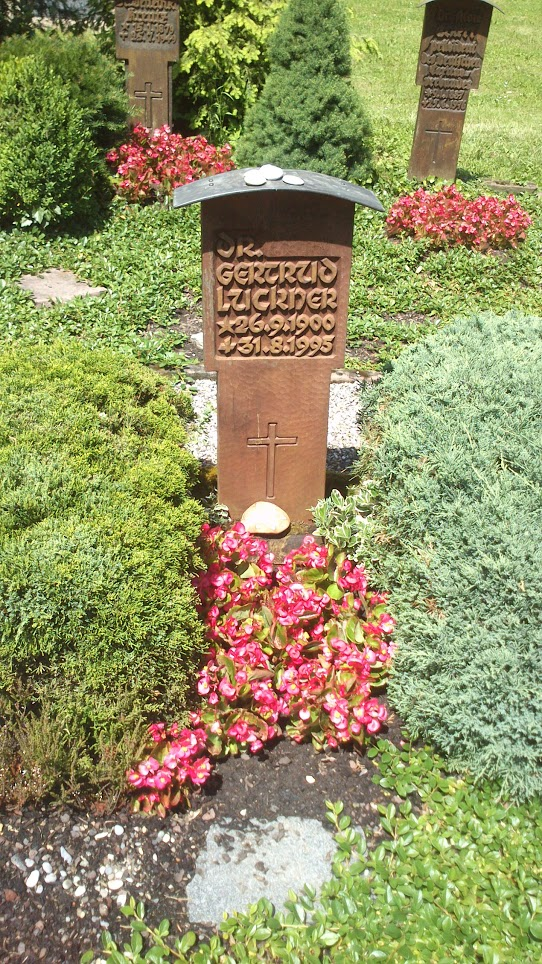
Gertrud Luckner's grave in the main cemetery in Freiburg im Breisgau

Before the transportation of Jews to concentration camps began, many of them were sent to work long hours in factories. However, Jews were only allowed to go to the shops between four and six in the afternoon. This meant that buying food became difficult. Gertrud organised some of her women friends to do the shopping for these Jewish families.

Following the outbreak of World War II, Luckner organized, with the support of Archbishop Conrad Gröber of Freiburg, and the protection of Benedikt Kreutz, an "Office for Religious War Relief" (Kirchliche Kriegshilfsstelle) under the auspices of Caritas. The office became the instrument through which Freiburg Catholics helped racially persecuted "non-Aryans" (both Jews and Christians).

In December 1941, Luckner was given a special power of attorney from Freiburg Archbishop Conrad Grober, who entrusted with tasks in the extraordinary pastoral care for so-called 'non-Aryan Catholics'. Travelling constantly, Luckner attempted to establish a national underground network through Caritas cells, providing financial support to individuals and Jewish religious communities. This relief effort was driven using funds received from the archbishop to smuggle Jews to Switzerland and to communicate the conditions for Jews to the outside world, remaining in contact with Leo Baeck, the leader of the Reich Union of the Jews in Germany, until his arrest in early 1943. She personally investigated the fate of the Jews being transported to the East and managed to obtain information on prisoners in concentration camps, and obtain clothing, food and money for forced labourers and prisoners of war.

== Arrest ==
The Gestapo had been monitoring the mail of Caritas since 1933 and had informants among church employees. In January 1943, Luckner was under constant surveillance. On 24 March 1943, she was arrested as a 'Catholic activist and fanatical opponent of National Socialism' on the D-train on the way from Freiburg to Berlin just before she could transfer funds destined for the last Jews of Berlin. After nine weeks of interrogation at different locations, she was sent as a political prisoner in "protective custody" to Ravensbrück concentration camp.

== Postwar ==
After the war, she returned to social work, assisting the victims of persecution and dedicated herself to Jewish-Christian understanding, visiting Israel in 1951. She established a journal, Freiburger Rundbrief (Freiburg Circular) in 1948, which she used to promote the cause. On 15 February 1966, she was recognised as Righteous among the Nations by Yad Vashem. She remained active in the cause until her death, in Freiburg on 31 August 1995.

== Legacy ==
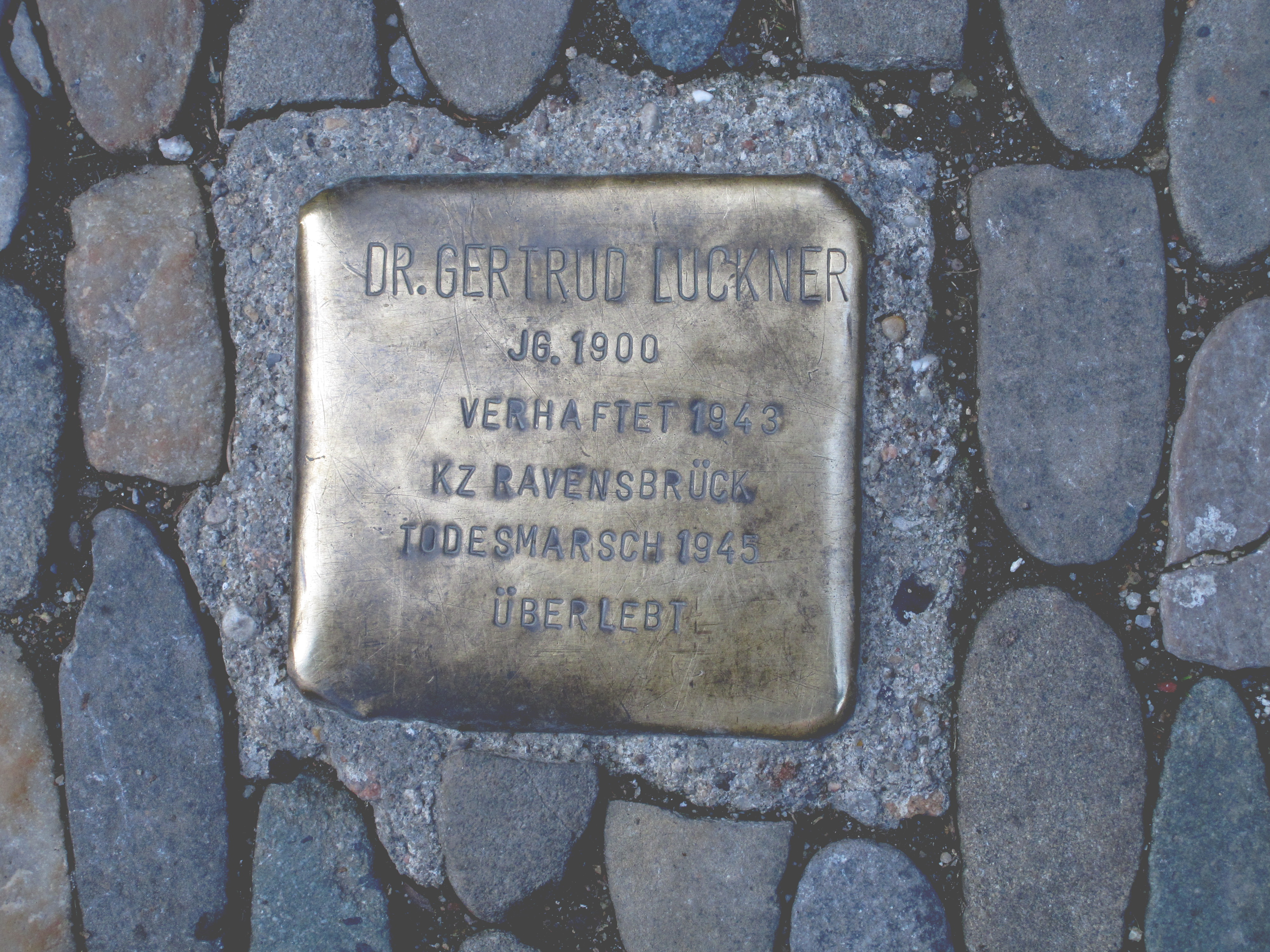
Dr. Gertrud Luckner – Stolperstein Freiburg

The German Caritas Association established the Gertrud Luckner Prize to promote social work and scientific examination of tasks and activities of voluntary welfare organizations.

In spring 2007, the readers of the Badische Zeitung, choose Gertrud Luckner as the most significant person from Freiburg.

The Gertrud-Luckner-Realschule is located in Rheinfelden, Switzerland. Gertrud-Luckner-Gewerbeschule is in Freiburg.

== See also ==
- Catholic Church and Nazi Germany
- Catholic resistance to Nazi Germany
- Margarete Sommer
