= St. Joseph, Wedding =

St. Joseph
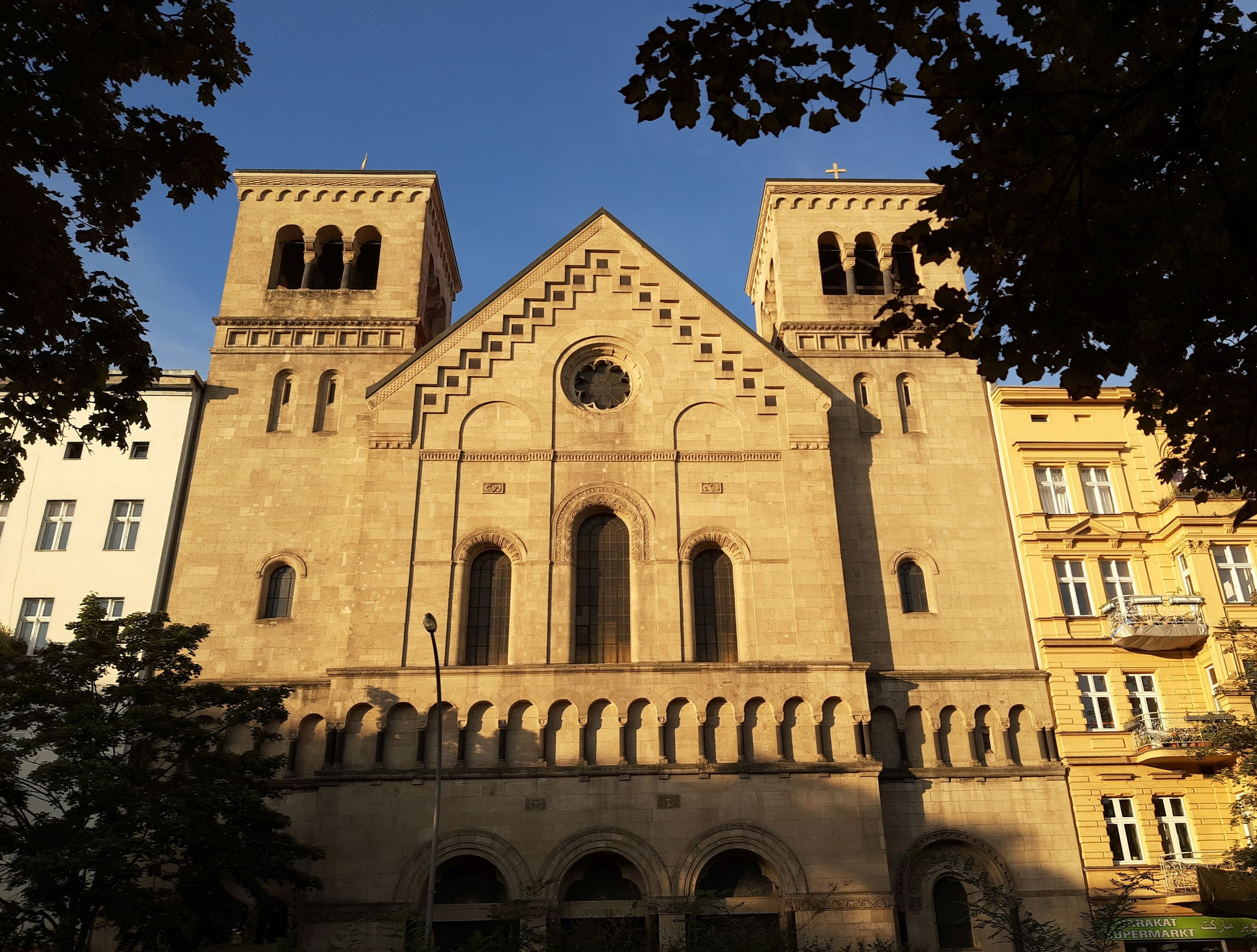
- Facade to Müllerstraße
- St. Joseph
- 52°32′38″N 13°21′46″E
- Location: Berlin-Wedding, Germany
- Denomination: Catholic

History
- Status: Parish church
- Dedication: Saint Joseph
- Consecrated: 1909

Architecture
- Architects: Wilhelm Rincklake; Wilhelm Frydag
- Style: Romanesque Revival

Administration
- Diocese: Berlin

St. Joseph is a Catholic church and former parish in Berlin-Wedding, Germany, built from 1907 to 1909 to a design by Wilhelm Rincklake, revised by Wilhelm Frydag in Romanesque Revival style. It seats 3000 people. Since 2018 the church has served as an interim cathedral while St. Hedwig's Cathedral is restored.

== History ==
A new parish and church were needed in Wedding after the establishment of the German Empire, when many Catholics moved into the city of Berlin, especially workers. An architectural competition was held, which was won by a design by Father Ludgerus, born Wilhelm Rincklake, a friar from Maria Laach. The Berlin architect Wilhelm Frydag revised the plans and Hermann Bunning supervised the construction which began in 1907. It is located between houses on Müllerstraße between houses and has two towers. The church was consecrated on 2 May 1909, dedicated to Saint Joseph, the patron saint of workers.

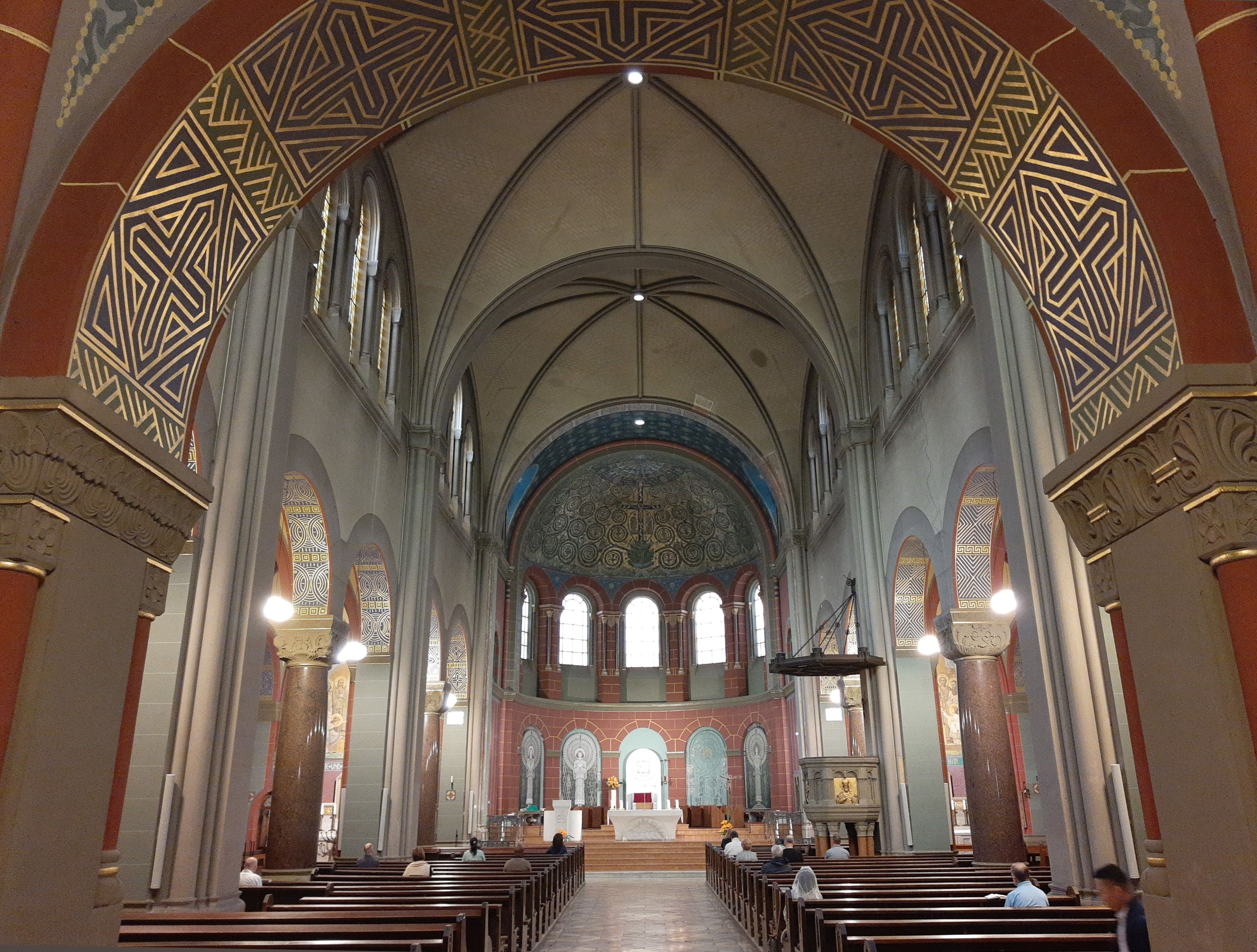
Interior

Damage in World War II was mostly repaired in 1948 and 1949. The paintings on the ceiling and walls were not restored because tastes had changed. The high pyramid roofs of the towers were replaced by rather flat roofs. Some features of the interior were retained, but not all were restored to their original state.

In 1995 the crypt, which was destroyed by bombing in 1945, was made a memorial site for victims of the war and for the priest Max Josef Metzger, who suffered martyrdom in 1944; the park opposite the church is named after him. The original high altar, which had also been destroyed, was replaced by a redesigned altar area in 1990. At the beginning of the 21st century the original painting of the interior was restored, retaining a Gesamtkunstwerk of the Beuron Art School.

From 2018 the church served as the interim cathedral for Berlin during the restoration of St. Hedwig's Cathedral. The parish became part of a larger parish, St. Elisabeth, together with St. Aloysius, St. Laurentius, St. Paulus, St. Petrus and St. Sebastian in November 2019.

== Architecture ==
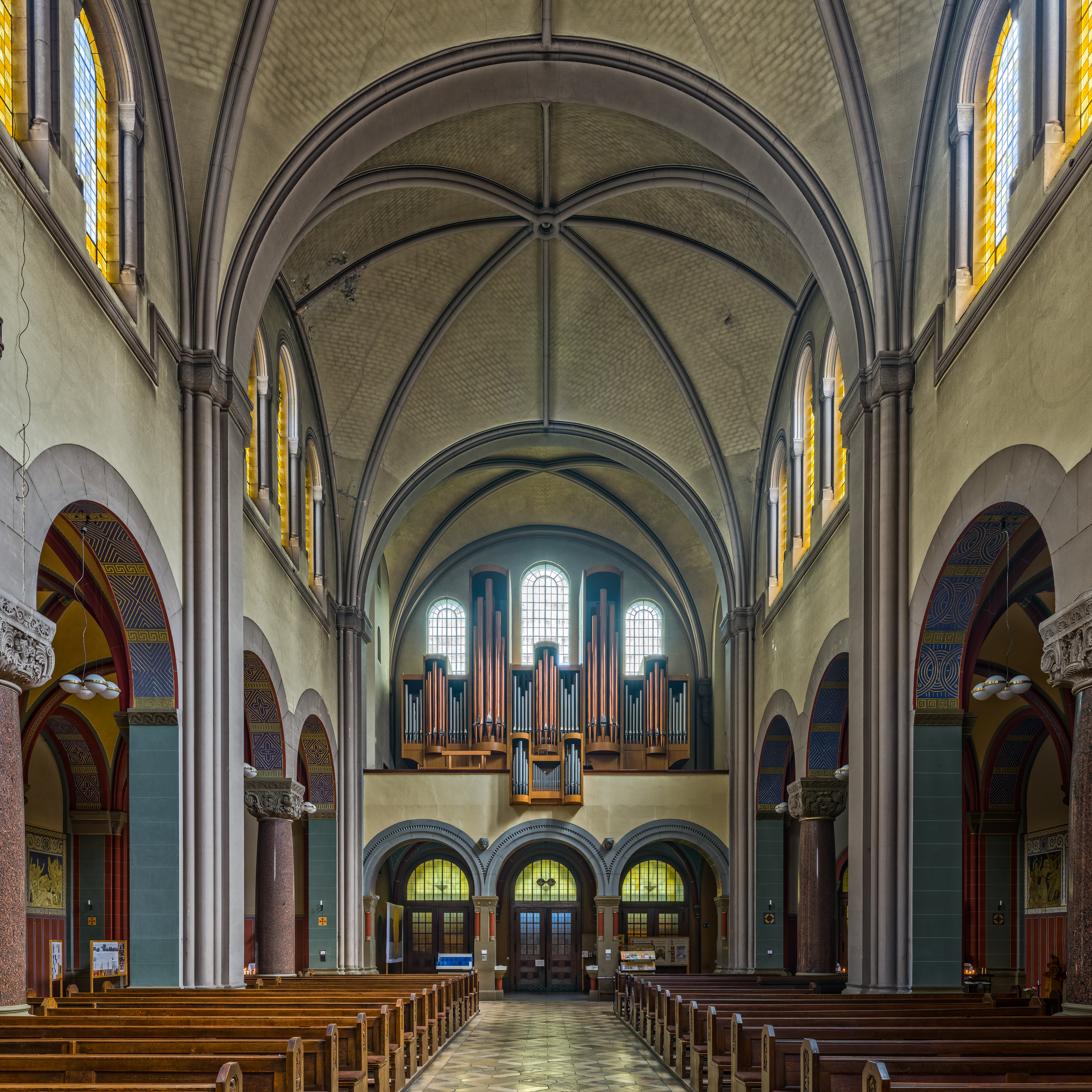
View to the organ

The style of the church is closely modelled on Romanesque churches from the 12th century. The façade is covered with grey limestone, horizontally divided into friezes and cornices. The interior is a basilica with three aisles. The nave consists of a high clerestory and three bays spanned by ribbed vaults. Between the nave and the side aisles six monolithic red granite columns alternate with pillars, in the Rhenish style. The column capitals are decorated with scenes from the legends of Saint Joseph.

The apse is semi-circular. The mosaic in the apse is a copy of the medieval upper church of San Clemente al Laterano in Rome. The walls were decorated with murals in the style of the Beuron Art School, completed in 1926. The altar area was remodelled in 1989/90. Its five high windows were made of Cryolite glass panes, similar to alabaster. The main altar and other furniture were made of Carrara marble. The Romanesque Revival altar of the Virgin Mary was retained unchanged.

The organ was built in 1981 by Wolfgang Eisenbarth Orgelbau from Passau, with 48 stops on three manuals and pedals. The key actions are mechanical, the stop actions are electric.
