= Conrad Gröber =

German Catholic priest and archbishop

- Archbishop of Freiburg im Breisgau
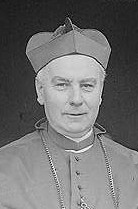
- Conrad Gröber in 1933
- Church: Catholic Church
- Archdiocese: Archdiocese of Freiburg im Breisgau
- In office: 21 May 1932 – 14 February 1948
- Predecessor: Karl Fritz
- Successor: Wendelin Rauch
- Previous post: Bishop of Meissen (1931-1932)

Orders
- Ordination: 28 October 1897 by Lucido Parocchi
- Consecration: 1 February 1931 by Karl Fritz

Personal details
- Born: 1 April 1872 Meßkirch, Grand Duchy of Baden, German Empire
- Died: 14 February 1948 (aged 75) Freiburg im Breisgau, Baden, French Zone, Allied-occupied Germany
- Coat of arms

Conrad Gröber (1 April 1872 in Meßkirch – 14 February 1948 in Freiburg im Breisgau) was a Catholic priest and archbishop of the Archdiocese of Freiburg.

== Life ==
=== Youth and education ===
Gröber was born in Meßkirch in 1872, to Alois and Martina Gröber. His father was a master carpenter. Gröber grew up during the period of the Kulturkampf. He first attended the gymnasium in Donaueschingen, then the Heinrich Suso-Gymnasium in Konstanz, and was an alumnus of the reopened Konradihaus (St. Conrad's Archdiocesan House of Studies). Already as a gymnasium student he had decided on a ministerial career. At the Albert-Ludwigs University in Freiburg im Breisgau he studied philosophy and theology starting in the winter semester of 1891-1892. In 1893 he became a student at the Pontifical Gregorian University in Rome. He was ordained a priest in October 1897, and completed his time in Rome in 1898 with a doctorate in theology. After a short time of activity as a vicar in Ettenheim he was a curate for two years at the St. Stephanskirche in Karlsruhe, where he became familiar with the specific problems of a city pastorate.

=== Teacher and pastor in Konstanz ===
In 1901 he became rector of the Konradihaus in Konstanz. There he met the students Max Josef Metzger, later a priest murdered by the Nazis, and Martin Heidegger, whom he actually started on the path of philosophy, and toward whom he had a lifelong but tense relationship. In 1905 he assumed the pastorate of Holy Trinity Church in Konstanz, and in 1922 he became rector of the Münster, the former cathedral church in Konstanz.

During the Konstanz years, Gröber was particularly active in publicity and scholarship. Under his direction the Holy Trinity Church and later the Konstanz Münster were thoroughly restored. He was not only involved in the work of church-linked organizations, but was active as a member of the Centre Party and as a representative on the Konstanz city council. He organized the celebrations for the 800th anniversary of the canonization of bishop Conrad of Constance, celebrated in 1923, and through his collaboration at the diocesan synod of 1921, became known throughout the region.

His ecclesiastical career took a step forward in 1923 when he was named a monsignor; in 1925 he was a canon of the cathedral chapter of Freiburg. In the diocesan curia he was assigned responsibility for liturgy and church music, in which capacity he introduced a new and warmly received diocesan hymnbook in 1929.

At this time, Gröber also became active as a preacher in the new medium of radio. At the Freiburg Katholikentag (Catholic assembly) of 1929, he met Eugenio Pacelli (later Pope Pius XII), on whose behalf he was decisively involved in the negotiations toward a concordat with the Reich.

=== Archbishop of Freiburg ===
Coat of arms of Conrad Gröber as Archbishop of Freiburg

He was ordained Bishop of Meissen, Germany, in 1931, and was installed as Archbishop of Freiburg im Breisgau in 1932.

==== Early support of the Nazi regime ====
Gröber was an early supporter of Adolf Hitler's rise to power. He became a supporting member of the Schutzstaffel in 1933, adopted the regime's anti-semitic rhetoric and offered only mild, ineffectual objections to inhumane policies such as compulsory sterilization or the eugenicist murder of people with disabilities in Aktion T4. At the start of the war, he expressed hope that, "the extermination struggle against godless communism [would be] ruthless".

In April 1933, Gröber opined that resistance to the Nazi regime was the folly of the "Martyrs of Stupidity" („Märtyrer der Dummheit“). Thus Gröber wrote in an exhortation dated 8 November 1933 on the subject of the vote and plebiscite regarding Germany's withdrawal from the League of Nations, that it was a duty to the fatherland to show unanimity with one's fellow countrymen. Among the populace, his policy of cooperation gained Gröber the nickname of Der braune Bischof (the brown Bishop). Thus during the course of the subordination of provincial governments to the Nazi central government, he directed a congratulatory telegram to the National Socialist politician appointed as proconsul in Baden, Robert Heinrich Wagner, containing the following message: "At the mighty task which lies before you, I place myself as the chief shepherd of Catholics in Baden unreservedly at your side." At the diocesan synod in Freiburg from 25–28 April 1933, he advised the diocesan clergy: "no provocation and no useless martyrdom."

In the negotiations to conclude the Reich concordat between Germany and the Holy See, even the German Bishops' Conference was kept at arm's length until shortly before the accord, but Gröber was provided preparatory information for the negotiations through his friend, Centre Party president Msgr. Ludwig Kaas; he eagerly promoted the process and thereby isolated himself from his fellow bishops. On 3 June 1933 a joint pastoral letter appeared from the German Bishops' Conference, the drafting of which the bishops had entrusted to Gröber. It contained a statement that if the State would only respect certain rights and requirements of the Church, the Church would gratefully and happily support the new situation.

In August 1933 the Archdiocese of Freiburg published in its official newspaper, which was under Gröber's responsibility, a directive of the Baden Ministry for Culture and Education about offering the Hitler salute in religious instruction, and thereby officially sanctioned this behavior, which led to considerable outrage among the faithful of the diocese. On 10 October 1933 at a large Catholic event in Karlsruhe Gröber expressly thanked the "men of the government" for their appearance: "I will not betray any secret if I explain that in the course of the last few months the contacts of the Church government in Freiburg with the government in Karlsruhe have proceeded in the most friendly way. I also believe that I will not be betraying a secret, either to you or to the German people, if I say that I place myself unreservedly behind the new government and the new Reich."

The Baden Interior Minister Pflaumer honored the cooperation promised by Gröber and sent the following directive to police headquarters on 13 November 1933: "Forceful measures against Catholic clergymen outside the framework of the general laws are not permitted in the future." At the end of the year 1933 Gröber complained in a letter to the Cardinal Secretary of State Eugenio Pacelli about priests critical of the regime, who had been taken into "protective custody" (Schutzhaft), that it had not always been possible to obtain from the clergy the intelligent reserve and opportune reflection that, under a full evaluation of the fundamental situation, protect individual clergymen from inconveniences.

Also in this time came his decision, together with a few men of the cathedral, to become a "supporting member" of the SS. He argued for "the national right to maintain the nation’s racial origin unpolluted and to do whatever is necessary to guarantee this end."

After the war Gröber explained this by saying that at the time the SS in Freiburg was considered the most decent organization of the Party.

In 1941 Gröber, whilst supporting attempts to help persecuted Jews, wrote in a pastoral letter that the sad state of the Jews resulted from the curse that they had brought upon themselves when they murdered Christ. Anton Rauscher has said that Catholic theology of the era reflected "a view of the Jews which provoked anti-Semitism on the one hand, while on the other undermining the ability to oppose it."

On Good Friday of 1941 he gave a sermon whose vocabulary came very close to the anti-Semitic vocabulary of the Nazi rulers:

"As a driving force behind the Jewish legal power stood the aggressive toadyism and malevolent perfidy of the Pharisees. They unmasked themselves more than ever as Christ's arch-enemies, deadly enemies.... Their eyes were blindfolded by their prejudice and blinded by their Jewish lust for worldly dominion." As for the "people" or, in his words, the "wavering crowd of Jews", the archbishop said, "The Pharisees' secret service had awakened the animal in it through lies and slander, and it was eager for grisly excitement and blood."

About Judas: "This unspeakable wretch... sits sycophantically at the Lord's Supper... at which Satan went into him... and placed him at the lead of the present-day servants of Judas.... In true Jewish fashion, he bargained with the high priests.... He [Christ] is betrayed with the sign of love bubbling over, with a smacking kiss from dirty Judas lips."

Finally at the scene of the Ecce Homo: "All the sympathy of the Jews is hidden under barbaric rawness. The beast has smelled human blood and wants to slake its wild-burning thirst with it.... At the same time the insane but truthful self-curse of the Jews screams: His blood come upon us and our children! The curse has been frightfully fulfilled. Unto this present day..."

On 15 July 1938, Britain's Catholic Herald reported that Groeber had released "An amazing document... giving a picture of the religious situation in Germany after five years of Nazi rule". The document protested a religious persecution of Catholics in Germany, detailing attacks on clergy, interference in the practice of the faith and operation of welfare organisations, confiscation of church property, restrictions on preaching the Gospel, and suppression of the Catholic press and Catholic education.

After the beginning of the organized killing of the mentally and physically handicapped, termed euthanasia, he protested in a letter to the Baden Interior Minister Pflaumer, and was the first of the German bishops to do so in writing, according to Schwalbach. On 1 August 1940, Gröber wrote to the head of the Reich Chancellery, and warned that the murders would damage Germany's reputation. He offered to pay all costs being incurred by the state for the "care of mentally ill people intended for death". He stopped short of any tactic that could be effective, however, leaving it to Clemens August Graf von Galen, bishop of Münster, to publicly oppose these murders at great personal risk.

Gröber held a protective arm over the German resistance worker Gertrud Luckner. Luckner organized, with the support of Gröber, an "Office for Religious War Relief" (Kirchliche Kriegshilfsstelle) under the auspices of the Catholic aid agency, Caritas. The office became the instrument through which Freiburg Catholics helped racially persecuted "non-Aryans" (both Jews and Christians). Luckner drove this relief effort, using funds received from the archbishop to smuggle Jews to Switzerland and communicate the conditions for Jews to the outside world. She personally investigated the fate of the Jews being transported to the East and managed to obtain information on prisoners in concentration camps, and obtain clothing, food and money for forced labourers and prisoners of war. Luckner was arrested by the Gestapo in November 1943, and imprisoned at Ravensbrück concentration camp.

The Kreisau Circle formed from around 1937 as one of the few clandestine German opposition groups operating inside Nazi Germany. Though multi-denominational, it had a strongly Christian orientation. Its outlook was rooted both in German romantic and idealist tradition and in the Catholic doctrine of natural law. Among its central membership were the Jesuit Fathers Augustin Rösch, Alfred Delp and Lothar König. König acted as an intermediary between the group and Conrad Grober.

==== Response to persecution of priests ====
On the other hand, he is still reproached to this day on the ground that he had not sufficiently supported the suffragan bishop Johannes Baptista Sproll who was driven out of his diocese of Rottenburg as early as 1938.

Gröber wrote a still controversial letter to the president of the Volksgerichtshof (People's Court) Roland Freisler, who had sentenced to death Max Josef Metzger, a priest of his diocese:

Esteemed Mr. President of the People's Court!

At this moment I am receiving the news of the proceeding that led to the death sentence of my diocesan priest Dr. Max Metzger. I lament most deeply the offense of which he has made himself guilty. If I depicted him as an idealist in my message addressed to Attorney Dr. Dix, this happened without any knowledge on my part of his criminal undertaking. I consider it important to share this with you, because it is utterly foreign to me to include his actions in the realm of idealism, as I depicted him.

While part of the literature considers this letter as a last-ditch approach used as a tactical measure, in order to obtain the conversion of the death sentence into a prison term, another part of the literature considers it a cowardly distancing from a man sentenced to death on invalid grounds. Yet source criticism is necessary here: other documents from those days show that Gröber in fact did take steps to gain a mitigation of the penalty. Thus it is clear Gröber believed that only by recognizing the grounds for the judgment could he have even a minimal chance of success vis-à-vis Freisler.

On 12 November, Gröber informed his diocesan clergy of the sentence against Metzger, with, among others, the following words:

This thoroughly sad case should teach us insistently that we refrain painstakingly from everything and anything that could hurt our Fatherland in any way in its difficult hour, and could hurt ourselves as well; that we honor, gratefully and prayerfully, the enormous sacrifices and successes of our soldiers in the field; strengthen the courage of our faithful in the homeland [...], consider the frightful disaster of a lost war with Bolshevistic consequences, and daily ask God... to protect our homeland and bless it with an honorable internal and external peace.

==== In the aftermath of the war ====
Yet the bitter confrontations from the Nazi era remained: Gröber tried to silence an event for the so-called "concentration camp priests", initiated by Pastor Wilhelm Köhler and Richard Schneider, who was the first diocesan clergyman taken to the Dachau concentration camp in 1940, although 5 of the 16 clergymen from Gröber's diocese imprisoned in the camp were murdered.

The "concentration camp priests", like the priests of the Münster diocese who were honored in a solemn way in a pontifical service by the bishop of Münster, wanted to commemorate their dead confreres and impress upon the public consciousness that the latter must not be allowed to have died in vain. The priests expressed the reproaches made against them in a resolution: "We are saddened when even now we have to hear from the clergy that we had only our own foolishness to blame, that we were victims of the Gestapo. We find it hard to avoid the impression that a priest was better liked by the church administration, the less he came into contact with the Secret State Police."

== 21st century ==
On 26 September 2019, Konstanz City Hall revoked honorary citizenship that was bestowed to Gröber in 1932, due to contemporary historical research that has widely documented his antijudaism and his membership in the SS. On 29 June 2023, the city of Konstanz removed his name from the Conrad-Gröber-Straße and renamed it after the same controversy concerning Gröber's early support to the III Reich and Nazi antisemitism.

== Works ==
- Geschichte des Jesuitenkollegs und -Gymnasiums in Konstanz, 1904
- Das Konstanzer Münster. Seine Geschichte und Beschreibung, 1914
- Die Mutter. Wege, Kraftquelle und Ziele christlicher Mutterschaft, 1922
- Reichenauer Kunst, 1924
- Heinrich Ignaz Freiherr von Wessenberg, In: Freiburger Diözesan Archiv 55, 1927; 56, 1928
- Christus Pastor. Bildnisse des guten Hirten, 1931
- Kirche und Künstler, 1932
- Handbuch der religiösen Gegenwartsfragen, 1937
- Die Reichenau, 1938
- Der Mystiker Heinrich Seuse. Die Geschichte seines Lebens. Die Entstehung und Echtheit seiner Werke, 1941
- Das Leiden unseres Herrn Jesus Christus im Lichte der vier heiligen Evangelien und der neuesten Zeitgeschichte, 1946
- Aus meinem römischen Tagebuch, 1947

== Sources ==
All references are in German.

- Hugo Ott: Conrad Gröber (1872-1948). In: Jürgen Aretz, Rudolf Morsey, Anton Rauscher (ed.): Zeitgeschichte in Lebensbildern. Aus dem deutschen Katholizismus des 19. und 20. Jahrhunderts. Vol. 6. Matthias-Grünewald-Verlag, Mainz 1984 ISBN 3-7867-1140-2
- Hugo Ott: Möglichkeiten und Formen kirchlichen Widerstands gegen das Dritte Reich von Seiten der Kirchenbehörde und des Pfarrklerus, dargestellt am Beispiel der Erzdiözese Freiburg im Breisgau. In: Historisches Jahrbuch 92 (1972), 312 ISSN 0018-2621
- Klaus Scholder: Die Kirchen und das Dritte Reich. Vol. 1. Propyläen, Frankfurt am Main, 1977 ISBN 3-550-07339-9 (New edition: Econ, München 2000 ISBN 3-612-26730-2)
- Klaus Scholder: Die Kirchen und das Dritte Reich. Vol. 2. 1985 ISBN 3-548-33091-6

Conrad Gröber Born: 1 April 1872 in Meßkirch Died: 14 February 1948 in Freiburg im Breisgau
Catholic Church titles
Preceded by Christian Schreiber	Bishop of Meissen; 1931–1932	Succeeded by Petrus Legge
Preceded by Karl Fritz	Archbishop of Freiburg; 1932–1948	Succeeded by Wendelin Rauch
