= Cletus Joseph Benjamin =

American prelate

Cletus Joseph Benjamin (May 2, 1909 – May 15, 1961) was an American prelate of the Roman Catholic Church. He served as an auxiliary bishop of the Archdiocese of Philadelphia from 1960 to 1961.

== Biography ==
Cletus Benjamin was born in Old Forge, Pennsylvania, to Evan Thomas and Mary (née Corcoran) Benjamin. He attended grade school in Forest City and high school in Scranton. He studied at St. Charles Borromeo Seminary in Overbrook for two years before entering the Pontifical North American College in Rome. He also studied at the Pontifical Gregorian University, where he earned a doctorate in theology.

Benjamin was ordained to the priesthood by Cardinal Francesco Marchetti Selvaggiani on December 8, 1935. Following his return to Pennsylvania, he served as secretary to Cardinal Dennis Joseph Dougherty from 1938 to 1943. He then served as vice-chancellor of the Archdiocese of Philadelphia until 1945, when he became full chancellor. He was named a domestic prelate by Pope Pius XII in 1947, and became pastor of the Church of the Incarnation in Philadelphia in 1954.

On August 17, 1960, Benjamin was appointed auxiliary bishop of Philadelphia and titular bishop of Binda by Pope John XXIII. He received his episcopal consecration on the following December 22 from Archbishop Egidio Vagnozzi, with Bishops Joseph Mark McShea and Joseph Carroll McCormick serving as co-consecrators, at the Cathedral of SS. Peter and Paul.

Less than a year after his elevation to the episcopacy, Benjamin died from a heart attack at the Church of the Incarnation, at age 52.

Catholic Church titles
Preceded by –	Auxiliary Bishop of Philadelphia; 1960–1961	Succeeded by –
