= Diocese of Leptis Magna =

The diocese of Leptis Magna was an ancient bishopric in Africa with its episcopal see in Leptis Magna, modern Al-Khums in Libya. After the Muslim conquest of the Maghreb it was abandoned but reinstated as a titular see in the Catholic Church in 1925.

== History ==
=== Ancient bishopric ===
Leptis Magna had a bishop from the second century onwards. The first known person known to have served as bishop if a certain Victor who became pope in 189. Bishop Archaeus composed a work on the dating of Easter around the year 200 and bishop Dioga participated at the Synod of 256 in Carthage. The Synod of 484 in Carthage was attended by bishop Callipides of Leptis Magna. After the Byzantine reconquest of Africa from the Vandals, a basilica dedicated to the Theotokos was built in the town and the Nicene creed reintroduced.

=== Titular See ===
The diocese was re-established as a titular see by the Catholic Church in the 20th century, first under the name Leptis Maior and since 1933 as Leptis Magna.

== List of ancient bishops ==
- Victor (later pope from 189 – 199)
- Archaeus (fl. 200 AD)
- Dioga (fl. 256)
- Callipides (fl. 4XX)

== List of titular bishops ==
- Ludovico Antomelli, O.F.M. (23 Feb 1913 Appointed – 10 Mar 1919 Appointed, Bishop of Bagnoregio (Bagnorea))
- Monalduzio Leopardi (26 May 1922 Appointed – 20 Dec 1926 Appointed, Bishop of Osimo e Cingoli)
- Jean Delay (10 Aug 1928 Appointed – 14 Aug 1937 Appointed, Bishop of Marseille)
- Alfonso Ferrandina (13 Apr 1938 Appointed – 15 Feb 1955 Died)
- Hermann Josef Schäufele (11 Apr 1955 Appointed – 14 Jun 1958 Confirmed, Archbishop of Freiburg im Breisgau)
- Wilhelm Pluta (4 Jul 1958 Appointed – 28 Jun 1972 Appointed, Bishop of Gorzów)
- John Buckley (16 Mar 1984 Appointed – 19 Dec 1997 Appointed, Bishop of Cork and Ross)
- Thomas Yeh Sheng-nan (10 Nov 1998 Appointed – )
