= Bački Gračac =

Bački Gračac Бачки Грачац (Serbian)
- Village (Selo)
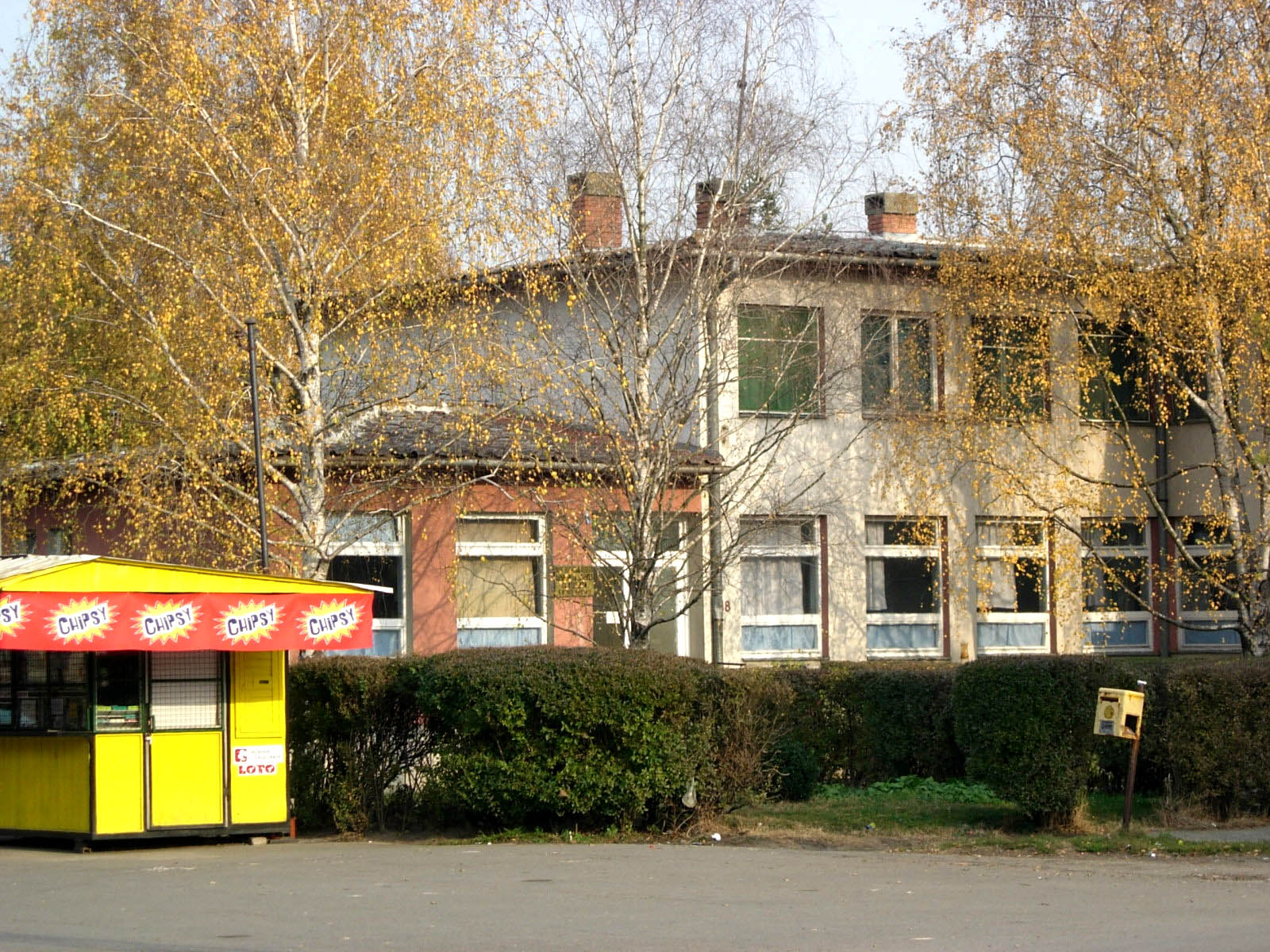
- Health centre in the village.

- Location within Vojvodina Location within Serbia Location within Europe
- Coordinates: 45°33′N 19°19′E
- Country: Serbia
- Province: Vojvodina
- Region: Bačka
- District: West Bačka
- Municipality: Odžaci

Population (2011)
  - Total: 2,295
- Time zone: UTC+1 (CET)
  - Summer (DST): UTC+2 (CEST)

Bački Gračac (Serbian Cyrillic: Бачки Грачац) is a village located in the Odžaci municipality, in the West Bačka District of Serbia. It is situated in the Autonomous Province of Vojvodina. The population of the village is 2,913 people (2002 census), of whom 2,810 are ethnic Serbs. This village is a former site of genocide.

== Name ==
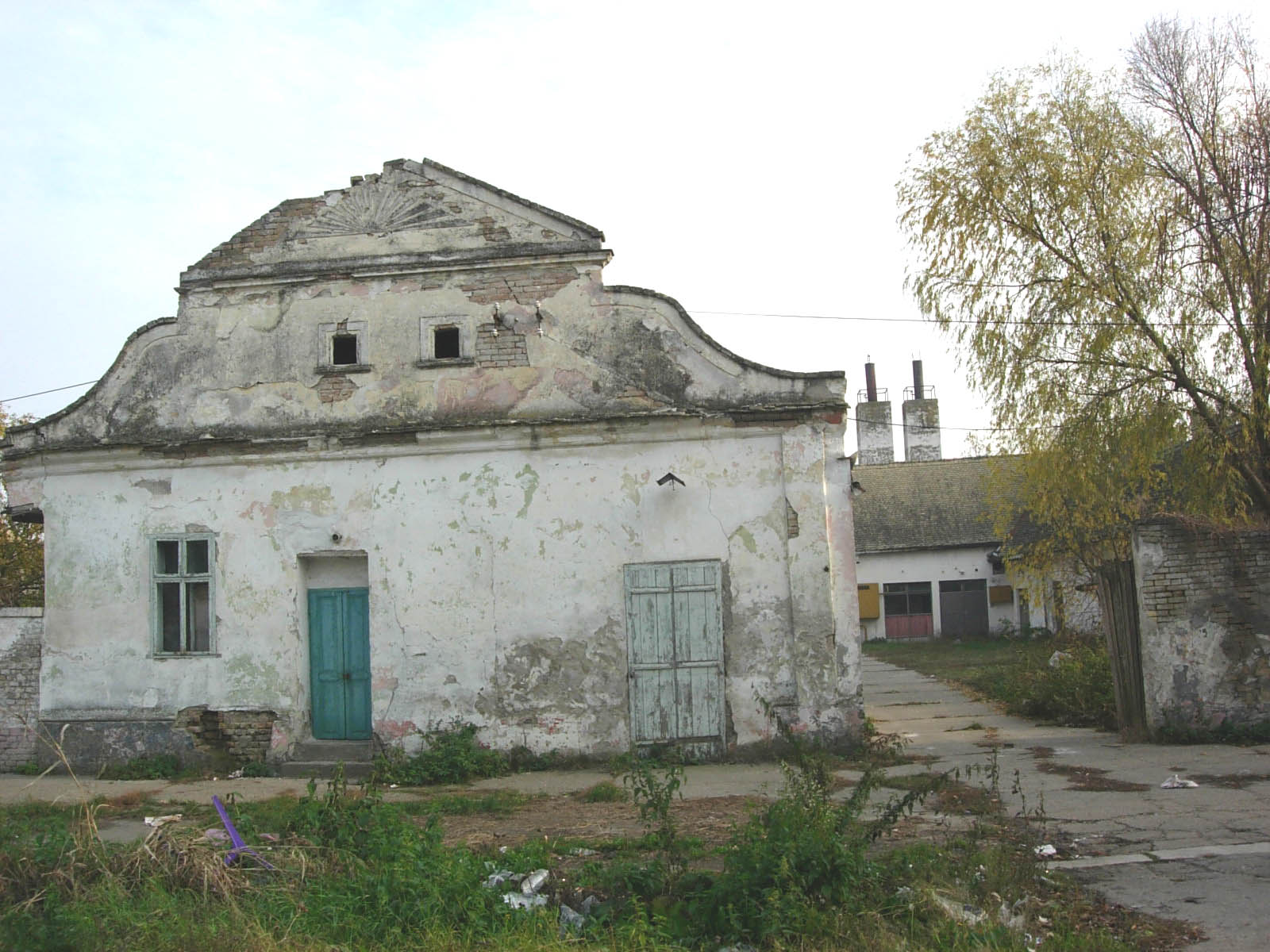
Old house. In this place would stay the future Orthodox church.

Old Serbian name of the village was Filipovo (Филипово). The modified versions of this Serbian name (Filipowa, Filipsdorf, Philipsdorf) were also used by Svabos/Shwoveh. Name was first recorded in the (presumably already modified) form Filipova in a document written in the time of the Hungarian King Béla III (1173–1196). Other names used for the village were: Filipovo Selo (in Serbian), Kindlingen, Sankt Philipp (in German), Szentfülöp, Szent-Fülöp (in Hungarian), Filipovo (in Croatian) and Филїпов (in Pannonian Rusyn).

== History ==
During the Ottoman rule (16th-17th century), the village of Filipovo was mainly populated by ethnic Serbs. In 1652, there were 7 houses, and a monastery. Following the fall of the Ottoman Empire, the region became part of the Austrian-Hungarian empire. The area having been depopulated by the lengthy Turkish wars, Germans citizens from Württemberg migrated to the area at the invitation of Empress Maria Theresa of Austria-Hungary, beginning in 1763. By 1764, 20 houses were built and soon a total of 60 houses were built with a population of 75 German families; by 1801, there were 272 houses. In the beginning of the 1900s there were 535 houses in the village. Before and during WWII there was a strong Kulturbund organization in the village. The Kulturbund (German: Schwäbisch-Deutscher Kulturbund) was an organization of Germans in Banat, Bačka and Srem, which during the Second World War helped the occupier and propagated German Nazism.

Founded in June 1920 in Novi Sad, it was initially conceived as a non-political organization operating throughout the Kingdom of Yugoslavia, with the aim of preserving and developing German culture and language.

With the entry of German forces after the April War, the Kulturbund became the headquarters of the Volksdeutsche, who, in large numbers, put themselves in the service of the Third Reich. There were dozens of volunteers from the village who joined the German Wehrmacht and SS units on the eastern front. German occupying forces committed many crimes and massacres in Serbia, many of which have elements of genocide.

German men, aged 16 to 65, were arrested and shot for aiding the Third Reich in its crimes in occupied territory. The remaining population was placed in transit camps. The camps consisted of property taken from the very people they were housed in, and were guarded by armed communist partisans. The town's population was sent to the Gakovo concentration camp. Many succumb to typhus, dysentery, or starvation. Some managed to escape the camps to Austria and Germany by 1945, and many later immigrated to Canada and the United States in the 1950s.

After the liberation of the village, the village is inhabited with 4,328 Serbians. For every family that moved to the village, the Germans and their Ustasha allies killed a family member. They were from the vicinity of Gračac in Lika, so the village got its current name - Bački Gračac. The maximum number of inhabitants in the settlement was reached in 1953, after which regression followed, which was mitigated to some extent by the beginning of the 21st century. After the genocide against the Serbs in Croatia in 1995, another large group of refugees arrived in the village.

== Historical population ==
- 1880: 3,039
- 1910: 3,881
- 1921: 3,806
- 1961: 4,284
- 1971: 3,343
- 1981: 2,996
- 1991: 2,924
- 2002: 2,913
- 2011: 2,295
- 2014: 2.273

== Notable people ==
- Robert Zollitsch, a German prelate of the Roman Catholic Church. He formerly served as Archbishop of Freiburg im Breisgau and Chairman of the German Episcopal Conference.
- Peter Kupferschmidt, a German football player.

== See also ==
- Odžaci
- West Bačka District
- Bačka
- Vojvodina
- List of places in Serbia
- List of cities, towns and villages in Vojvodina
