= Robert Zollitsch =

Archbishop of Freiburg im Breisgau

His Excellency Robert Zollitsch
- Archbishop Emeritus of Freiburg im Breisgau
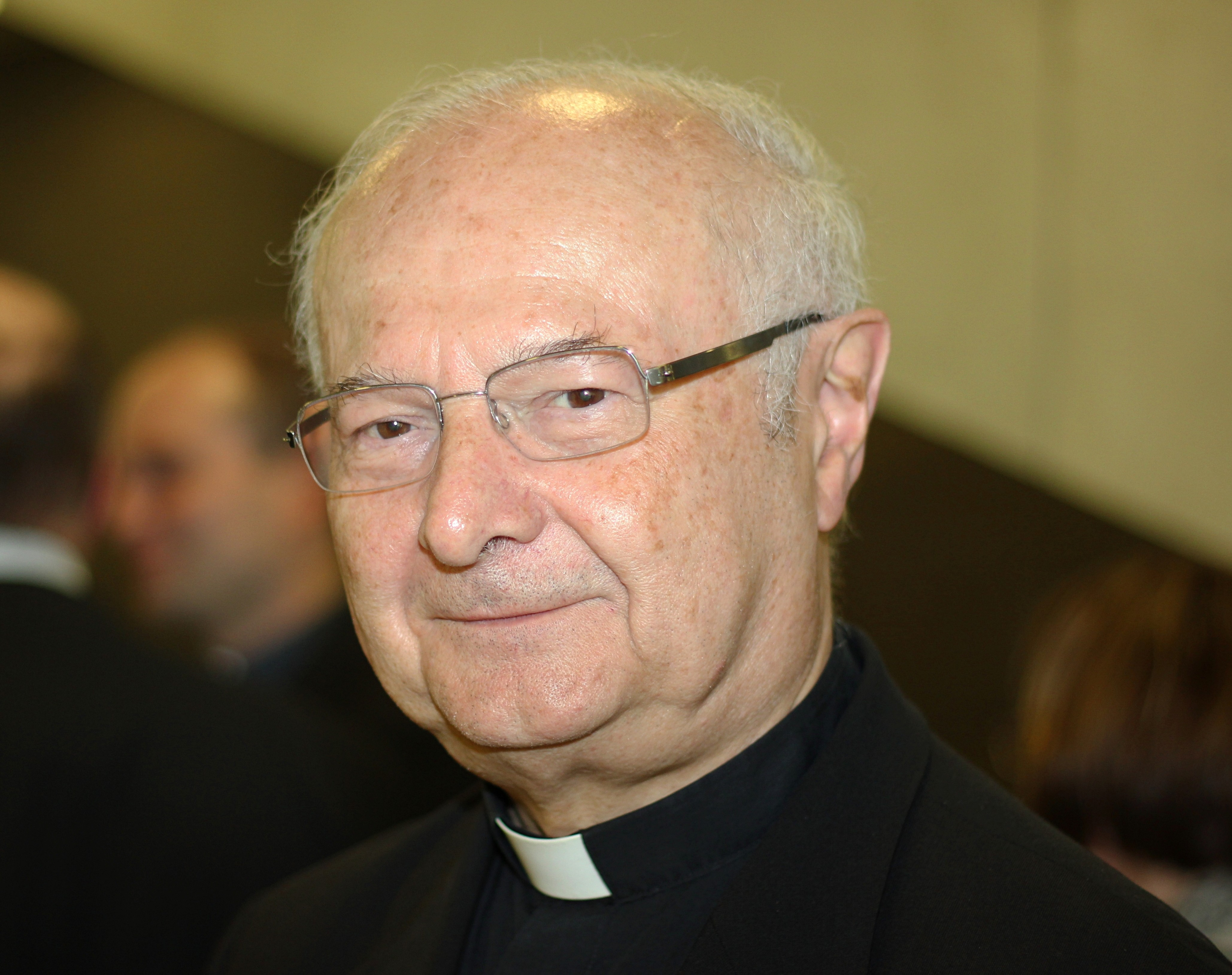
- Archdiocese: Freiburg im Breisgau
- Province: Freiburg im Breisgau
- Appointed: 16 June 2003
- Installed: 20 July 2003
- Term ended: 17 September 2013
- Predecessor: Oskar Saier

Orders
- Ordination: 27 May 1965 by Hermann Josef Schäufele
- Consecration: 20 July 2003 by Oskar Saier

Personal details
- Born: 9 August 1938 (age 88) Bački Gračac, Danube Banovina, Kingdom of Yugoslavia
- Denomination: Roman Catholic
- Motto: In fidei communione In the communion of faith
- Coat of arms: Robert Zollitsch's coat of arms

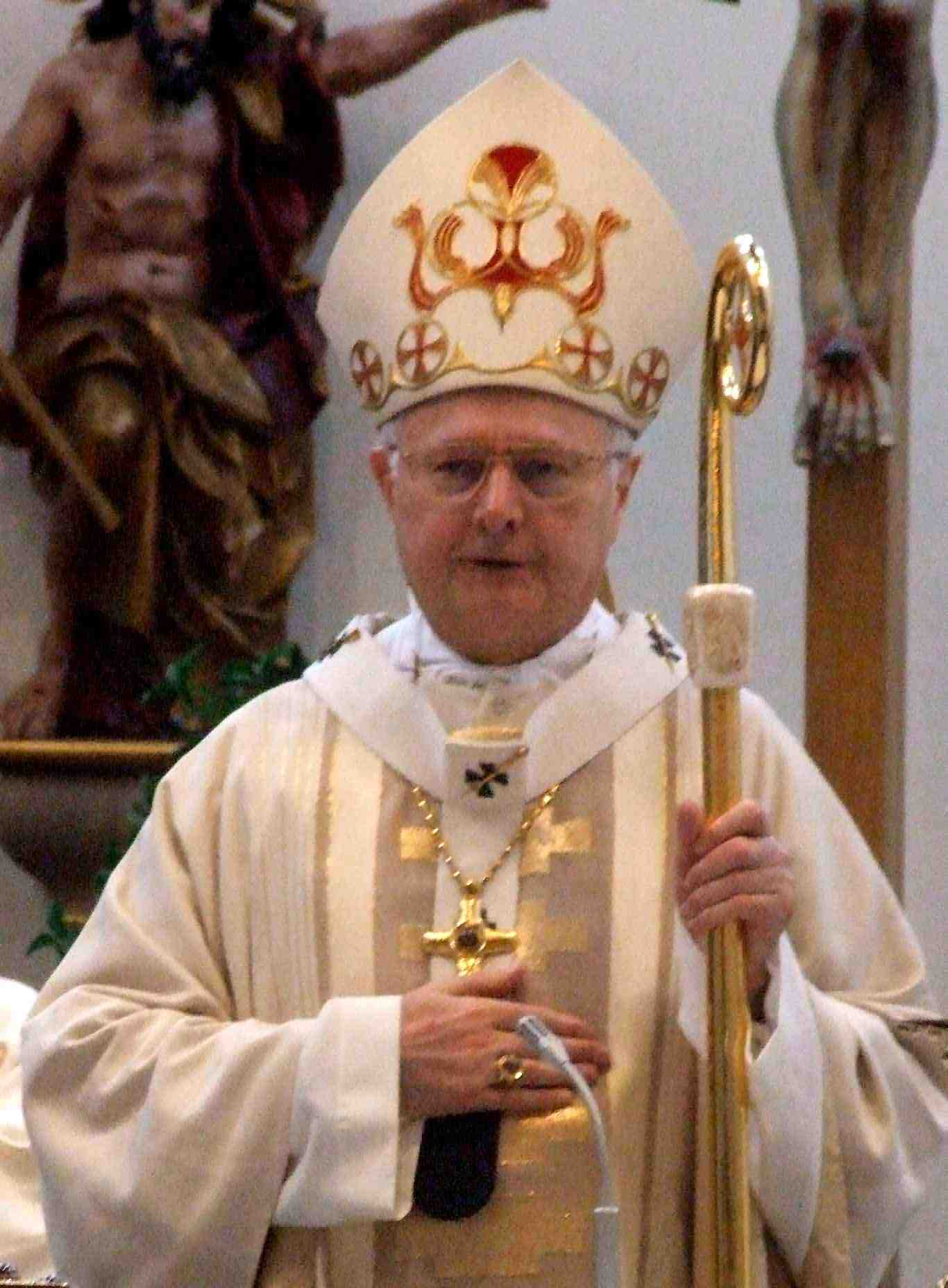
Robert Zollitsch (2006)

Styles of Robert Zollitsch
- Reference style: The Most Reverend
- Spoken style: Your Excellency
- Religious style: Monsignor
- Posthumous style: not applicable

Robert Zollitsch (German pronunciation: [ˈʁoːbɛʁt ˈtsɔlɪtʃ]; born 9 August 1938) is a German prelate of the Roman Catholic Church. He was Archbishop of Freiburg im Breisgau from 2003 to 2013 and was Chairman of the German Episcopal Conference from 2008 to 2014.

In April 2023, the report of an independent commission investigating sexual abuse in the Archdiocese of Freiburg showed that he hid files, transferred perpetrators and ignored church law.

== Early life and education ==
Zollitsch was born in Philipsdorf/Filipovo, Yugoslavia (modern-day Serbia), to an ethnic German family of Danube Swabians who moved to Tauberbischofsheim in 1946 after being violently expelled from communist Yugoslavia following World War II. His 16-year-old brother was killed in 1945, after the end of the war, during summary execution massacres by Yugoslav partisans of Josip Broz Tito. Zollitsch was educated in several schools, became a member of the Schoenstatt Institute of Diocesan Priests in 1964, and was ordained to the priesthood by Archbishop Hermann Schäufele on 27 May 1965, in the Cathedral of Freiburg im Breisgau.

== Career ==
In 1974 and 1980 Zollitsch was elected to the general council of the Schoenstatt Institute. In 1983, he was named archdiocesan personnel manager for Freiburg im Breisgau. He became a member of the cathedral chapter in 1984 as well.

In June 2003, Zollitsch was appointed Archbishop of Freiburg im Breisgau to lead the second-largest diocese in Germany by Pope John Paul II. In July he received his episcopal consecration on the following 20 July from his predecessor, Archbishop Oskar Saier, with Cardinal Karl Lehmann and Archbishop Giovanni Lajolo serving as co-consecrators.

On 12 February 2008, Zollitsch was elected to succeed Cardinal Lehmann as the Chairman of the German Episcopal Conference, and thus spokesman for the German Church. His election was welcomed by many German figures and groups, including Chancellor Angela Merkel, Lutherans, Social Democrats, and Christian Democrats.

Zollitsch formerly sat on the Permanent Council and the Commission for Clergy, Consecrated Life, and Laity within the same episcopal conference.

== Views and positions ==
As of 2008, according to Earth Times, Zollitsch had been considered to be a liberal in his convictions, and has described himself as being "theologically and personally" close to Cardinal Karl Lehmann.

As of 2008, Zollitsch has accepted civil unions by states but was against the term "gay marriage". As of 2013, he favoured women becoming deacons. In 2009, he said in a statement he was working towards damage control in the wake of the controversy over negationist comments made by Society of Saint Pius X (SSPX) bishop Richard Williamson.

=== Catholic Church sexual abuse cases in Germany, 2010 - present ===
In March 2010 Zollitsch met with the Pope Benedict to further discuss the widening sexual abuse scandal in Germany, when former students at Canisius-Kolleg Berlin Berlin's élite Jesuit high school, went public with accusations against two former priests.

Similar allegations then emerged at other Catholic schools and institutions in Germany, including a Benedictine monastery and several boarding schools. German Justice Minister Sabine Leutheusser-Schnarrenberger condemned the "wall of silence" within the Catholic hierarchy, accusing the church of hiding behind a 2001 Vatican directive that called for cases of abuse to be investigated internally before going to state authorities. "This directive makes clear that even serious abuse allegations fall under papal confidentiality and thus should not be forwarded on outside the church," she said.

In April 2023, the report of an independent commission investigating sexual abuse in the Archdiocese of Freiburg showed that he hid files, transferred perpetrators and ignored church law.

=== Materialistic ostentation ===
In the wake of the 2013 ouster of Franz-Peter Tebartz-van Elst as bishop of Limburg, Zollitsch distinguished materialistic ostentation from the cost of supporting the church's ordinary administration: regarding his car, for example, he argued, "To me that car is not a status symbol; it is the office I use when I am traveling."

Catholic Church titles
Preceded by Oskar Saier	Archbishop of Freiburg im Breisgau; 2003–2013	Succeeded by Stephan Burger
Preceded by Karl Lehmann	Chairman of the German Episcopal Conference; 2008–2014	Succeeded by Reinhard Marx
