= Hermann Schäufele =

20th century German Roman Catholic clergyman

The Most Reverend Hermann Schäufele
- Archbishop of Freiburg; Metropolitan of the Upper Rhine Province
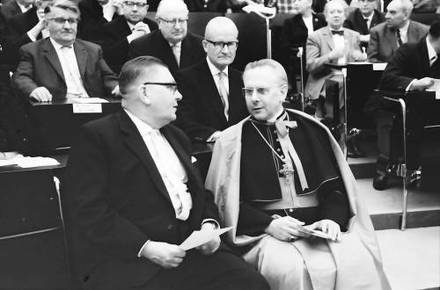
- Archbishop Schäufele (right) with Hermann Müller
- Church: Roman Catholic Church
- Province: Province of Freiburg
- Diocese: Archdiocese of Freiburg
- Predecessor: Eugen Seiterich
- Successor: Oskar Saier
- Previous posts: Auxiliary bishop of Freiburg, Titular bishop of Leptis Magna (1955.04.11 – 1958.06.14)

Orders
- Consecration: 16 September 1958

Personal details
- Born: Hermann Schäufele
- Died: 26 June 1977 Austria
- Denomination: Roman Catholic Church
- Coat of arms

Hermann Schäufele (14 November 1906 – 26 June 1977) was the Archbishop of Freiburg from 1958 to 1977, appointed by Pope Pius XII. He participated in the Vatican Council II.

== Biography ==
Schäufele studied theology in Freiburg and Rome. He was ordained in 1931. During the Nazi years, Schäufele continued theological and philosophical studies, leading to doctorates in both disciplines. In 1946, he became director of the Episcopal seminary Borromaeum for the formation of priests. In April 1955, he was consecrated as bishop, - functioning as the only auxiliary in the large archdioceses with almost 2000 priests. His titular bishopric was the diocese of Leptis Magna. After the death of the Archbishop of Freiburg, Schäufele was appointed by Pope Pius XII as his successor. He assumed his office on 16 September 1958.

He founded schools, hospitals and research institutes. In the 1960s, he became known for an initiative, "Year for the Church", by which young people volunteered one year for Church service. Theologically conservative, he was open to ecumenical dialogues. A deeply spiritual person and fervent admirer of the Virgin Mary, he prayed daily the rosary. He died during his annual vacations in Austria on 26 June 1977, aged 70, while reciting the rosary.

== Relation to Pope Pius XII ==
Becoming archbishop of Freiburg on 16 September 1958, Schäufele was one of the last appointees of the Pontiff, who died only three weeks later. Hermann Schäufele assisted in the translation and edition of the Soziale Summe Pius XII, which lists all speeches and writings of Pope Pius XII, and includes the text of all non-theological ones. While there are listings and summary editions of the theology of the Pope in several languages, this edition is as of date the only complete publication of the non-theological writings of the late pontiff in any language.

In 1946, Schäufele published a book on the social order and international relations according to the teachings of Pope Pius XII. As archbishop, he regularly quoted from the teachings, encyclicals and speeches of Pope Pius XII.

== Sources ==
- Hermann Schäufele, Pius XII, Papst, Zur Neuordnung im Staats- und Völkerleben. Ansprachen. Waibstadt (bei Heidelberg), Kemper 1946. 19 cm. 250 Seiten
- Gehrig, Helmut, Über das Bischöfliche Amt : Festakademie anlässlich died 70. Geburtstages Seiner Exzellenz d. hochwürdigsten Herrn Erzbischofs von Freiburg Hermann Schäufele / [Hrsg. Helmut Gehrig] Paolo Marella .... - Karlsruhe : Badenia Verl., 1966 [erschienen] 1967. - 83 S.; (dt.) (Veröffentlichungen der Katholischen Akademie der Erzdiözese Freiburg; 4) Festschrift Hermann Schäufele

Hermann Schäufele Born: 14 November 1906 in Stebbach Died: 6 June 1977 in Langenegg
Catholic Church titles
Preceded by Eugen Seiterich	Archbishop of Freiburg; 1958–1977	Succeeded by Oskar Saier
