= Bindaios =

Town of ancient Pisidia

Coordinates: 37°51′57″N 30°43′17″E

Bindaios, also Binda, was a town of ancient Pisidia inhabited during Roman and Byzantine times. Under the name Binda, it became the seat of a bishop.

Its site is located near Küçük Gökceli (formerly Findos, in Isparta District) in Asiatic Turkey.

== Ecclesiastical history ==
The bishop of Binda was a suffragan bishop of Antiochia in Pisidia. The episcopal see is not mentioned in the Notitiae Episcopatuum of Pseudo-Epiphanius, which can be dated to 640, but appears in that attributed to Byzantine Emperor Leo VI the Isaurian.

Three bishops of the see are known through their participation in church councils. Theodorus was at the Trullan Council of 692. At the Council of Constantinople (879) there were two bishops of Binda, Stephanus and Paulus, perhaps, as in other cases, one ordained by Patriarch Ignatius of Constantinople, the other by Photius. No longer a residential bishopric, Binda is today listed by the Catholic Church as a titular see.

No longer a residential bishopric, it remains a titular see of the Roman Catholic Church. Past incumbents include John D'Alton (1942–1943), Ignácio Krause (1944–1946), Celestino Fernández y Fernández (1948–1952), Eugen Seiterich (1952–1954), Bernard Joseph Topel (1955–1955), Joseph Calasanz Fließer (1956–1960), Cletus Joseph Benjamin (1960–1961), Gaetano Alibrandi (1961–2003).
