= Archdiocese of Freiburg =

Roman catholic metropolitan archdiocese in Germany

Coordinates: 47.9833°N 7.8500°E

Archdiocese of Freiburg im Breisgau Archidioecesis Friburgensis Erzbistum Freiburg

Catholic
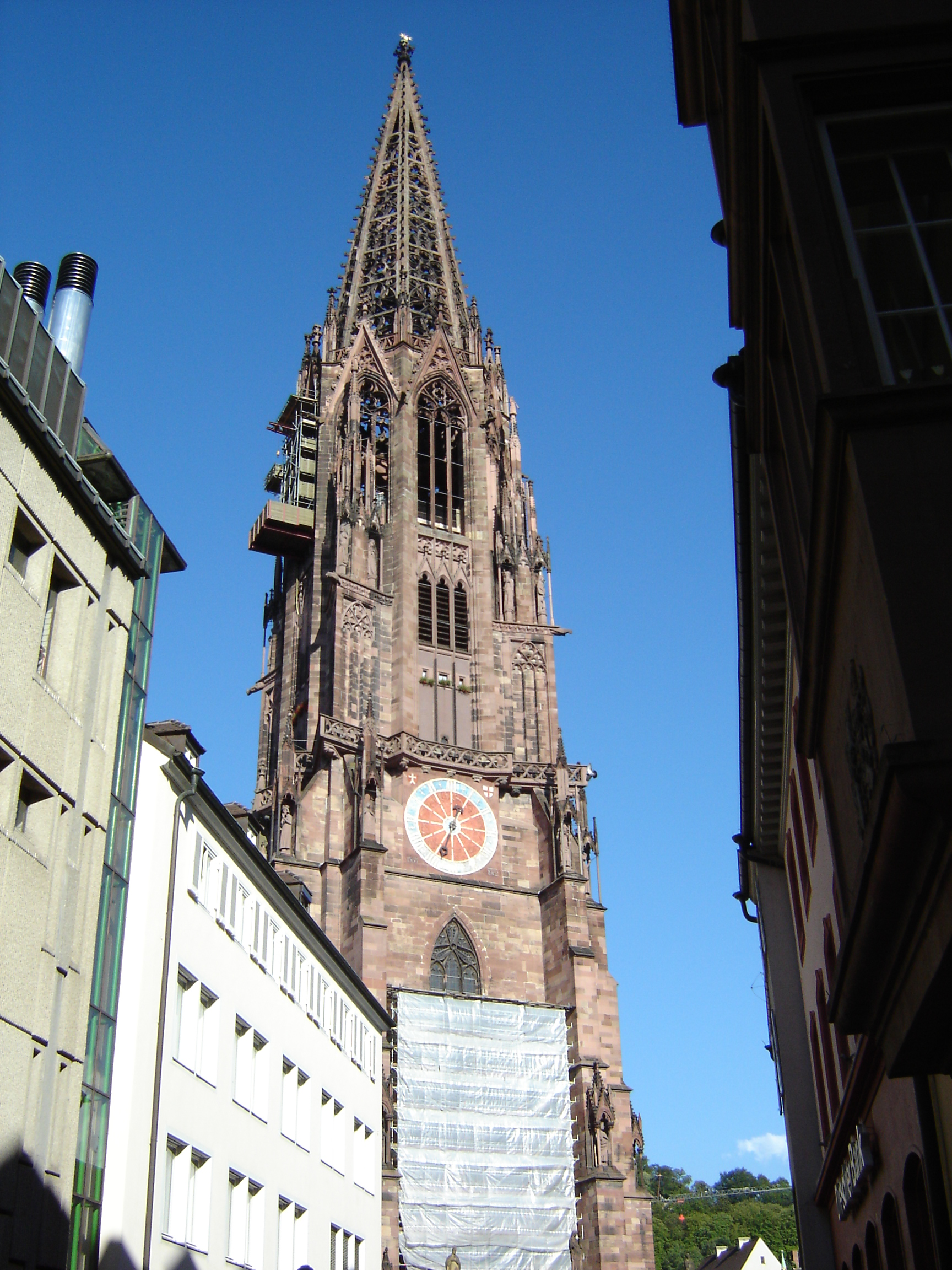
- Freiburg Minster

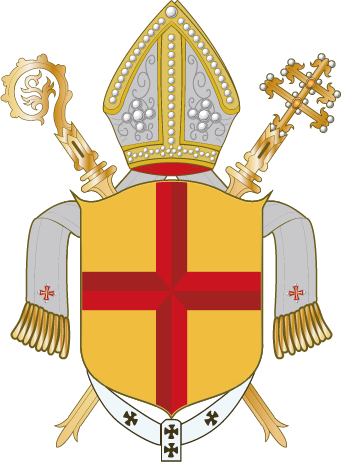
- Coat of arms

Location
- Country: Germany
- Ecclesiastical province: Freiburg

Statistics
- Area: 16,229 km^{2} (6,266 sq mi)
- Population: Total; Catholics: (as of 2019); 4,791,293; 1,855,485 (38.7%)

Information
- Denomination: Catholic
- Sui iuris church: Latin Church
- Rite: Roman Rite
- Established: 16 August 1821
- Cathedral: Freiburg Minster
- Patron saint: Virgin Mary; St. Conrad of Constance; St. Gebhard of Constance

Current leadership
- Pope: Leo XIV
- Metropolitan Archbishop: Stephan Burger
- Auxiliary Bishops: Peter Birkhofer
- Bishops emeritus: Robert Zollitsch, Rainer Klug, Paul Friedrich Wehrle

Map
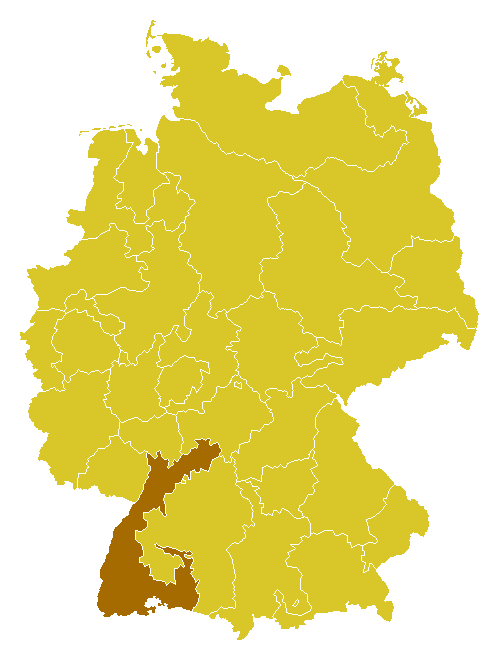

Website
- ebfr.de

The Archdiocese of Freiburg im Breisgau (Latin Archidioecesis Friburgensis) is a Latin Church diocese of the Catholic Church in Baden-Württemberg comprising the former states of Baden and Hohenzollern. The Archdiocese of Freiburg is led by an archbishop, who also serves as the metropolitan bishop of the Upper-Rhine ecclesiastical province for the suffragan dioceses of Mainz and Rottenburg-Stuttgart. Its seat is Freiburg Minster in Freiburg im Breisgau.

The 14th Archbishop of Freiburg, Robert Zollitsch, followed his predecessor Oskar Saier, who served from 1978 to 2002. On May 30, 2014 Stephan Burger was elected by the Chapter as the new Archbishop of Freiburg. He was ordained as bishop on June 29, 2014.

== History ==
The Ecclesiastical Province of Freiburg (Kirchenprovinz Freiburg) or Upper Rhenish Ecclesiastical Province (Oberrheinische Kirchenprovinz) is an ecclesiastical province of the Roman Catholic Church in the Upper Rhine area of Germany, centring on Freiburg im Breisgau. It covers the Roman Catholic Archdiocese of Freiburg, the Roman Catholic Diocese of Mainz and the Roman Catholic Diocese of Rottenburg-Stuttgart, covering large areas of Baden-Württemberg and Hesse and small parts of Rhineland-Palatinate. Its metropolitan bishop is the Archbishop of Freiburg - that Archdiocese and the Province were both set up in 1821 in the wake of the 1801 Concordat and the 1815 Congress of Vienna.

In 1821 the Archdiocese of Freiburg was founded out of the Diocese of Constance as well as parts of the Mainz, Straßburg, Worms and Würzburg dioceses. Bernhard Boll became the first bishop in 1827. Well known successors were Conrad Gröber and Hermann Schäufele.

Today, church closures are not seen in the archdiocese of Freiburg. The same goes for the consolidation of parishes. The Archdiocese of Freiburg exercises the concept of "unions of pastoral guidance."

On November 1, 2005 the archbishop Dr. Robert Zollitsch enacted "Pastoral Guidelines" for the first time in the history of the Archdiocese. These guidelines are given the title "Shaping the awakening."

== Patron saints ==
- Virgin Mary
- Conrad of Constance (Bishop of Constance)
- Gebhard of Constance (Bishop of Constance)

== Diocese organization ==
The Archdiocese is organized into seven regions, and these regions are in turn organized into numerous deaneries.

- Region of Odenwald / Tauber
  - Deanery of Tauberbischofsheim
  - Deanery of Lauda
  - Deanery of Buchen
  - Deanery of Mosbach
- Region of Rhine / Neckar
  - Deanery of Weinheim
  - Deanery of Mannheim
  - Deanery of Heidelberg
  - Deanery of Wiesloch
  - Deanery of Kraichgau
- Region of Middle Oberrhein / Pforzheim
  - Deanery of Philippsburg
  - Deanery of Bruchsal
  - Deanery of Bretten
  - Deanery of Karlsruhe
  - Deanery of Pforzheim
  - Deanery of Ettlingen
  - Deanery of Murgtal
  - Deanery of Baden-Baden
- Region of Ortenau
  - Deanery of Offenburg
  - Deanery of Acher-Renchtal
  - Deanery of Lahr
  - Deanery of Kinzigtal
- Region of Breisgau / Schwarzwald / Baar
  - Deanery of Breisach / Endingen
  - Deanery of Waldkirch
  - Deanery of Freiburg
  - Deanery of Neuenburg
  - Deanery of Neustadt
  - Deanery of Villingen
  - Deanery of Donaueschingen
- Region of Hochrhein
  - Deanery of Wiesental
  - Deanery of Waldshut
  - Deanery of Säckingen
  - Deanery of Wutachtal
- Region of Lake Constance / Hohenzollern
  - Deanery of Western Hegau
  - Deanery of Eastern Hegau
  - Deanery of Konstanz
  - Deanery of Linzgau
  - Deanery of Meßkirch
  - Deanery of Sigmaringen
  - Deanery of Zollern

The northernmost archdiocese jurisdiction is the parish of St. Laurentius in Freudenberg.

== Church institutions ==
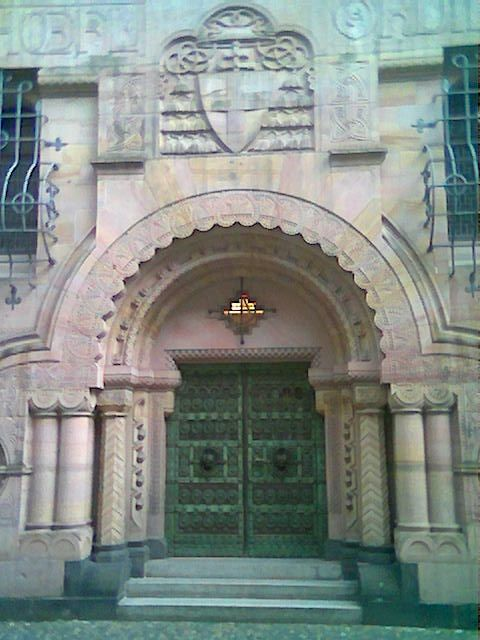
Entrance to the ordinariate of the archbishop, Freiburg Breisgau

=== Schools ===
Through its scholarly foundation the Archdiocese of Freiburg administers 17 comprehensive secondary schools (Gymnasien), 6 secondary schools (Realschulen), one primary school, one technical school for elderly care, one vocational college, and two boarding schools.

=== Seminaries ===
The Archdiocese maintains a priestly seminary in Freiburg, the Collegium Borromaeum (CB), where candidates for priesthood live during their theological studies at Freiburg's Albert-Ludwigs University. The CB lies in proximity to the Freiburger Cathedral and the ordinariate of the archbishop. Archbishop Robert Zollitsch was, among other things, a repetitor (tutor) at the CB for several years. Pastoral training takes place in a seminary in St. Peter, where Robert Zollitsch likewise functioned as a lecturer.

== Literature ==
- Archdiocese of Freiburg (2001). Realschematismus der Erzdiözese Freiburg i. Br (in German). Karlsruhe: Archbishop Ordinariate of Freiburg i. Br. OCLC 314084689.

== See also ==
- Freiburg Declaration, 2012 letter from Catholic priests
