= Justus Knecht =

German Catholic theologian and writer (1839–1921)

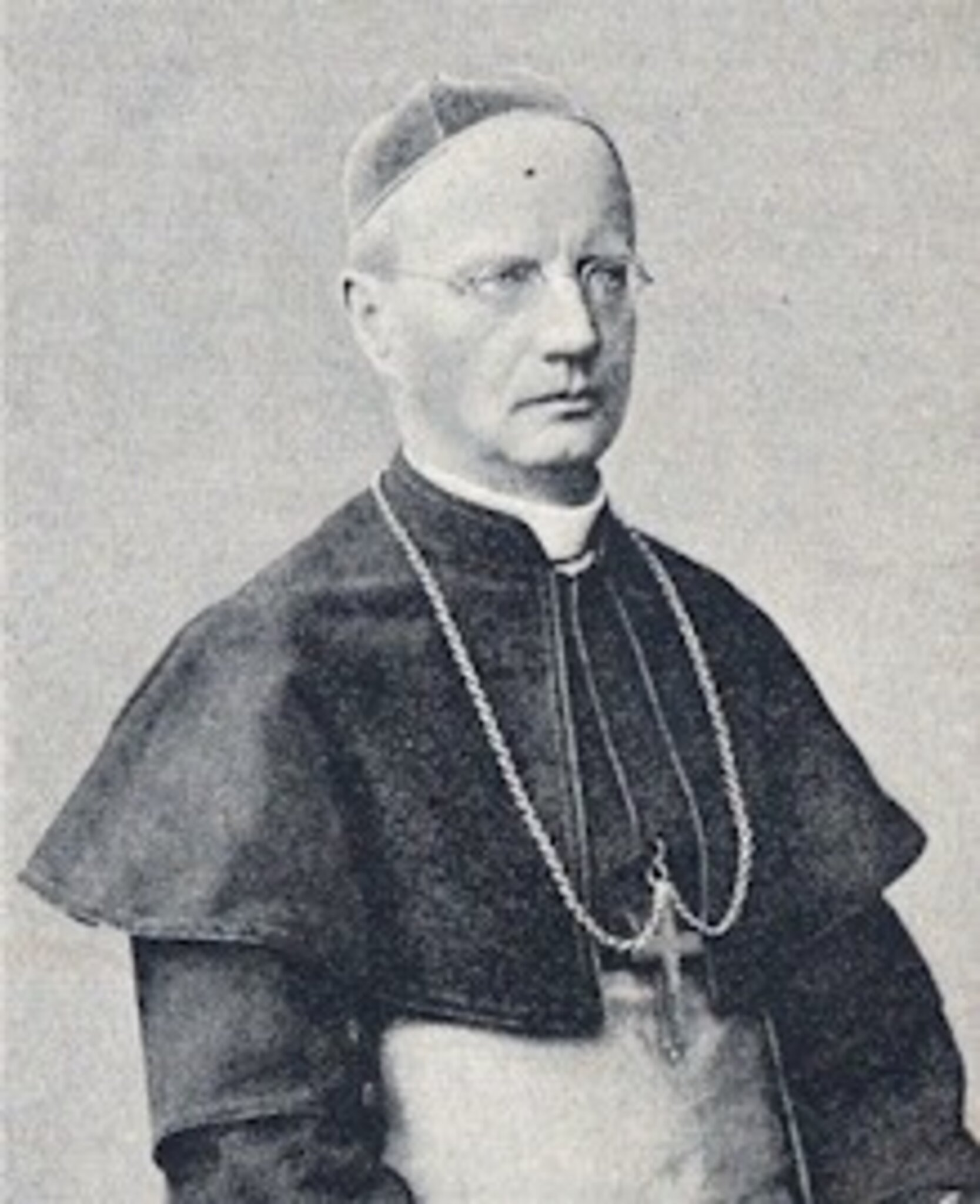
Justus Knecht

Friedrich Justus Heinrich Knecht (7 October 1839 – 31 January 1921) was a German Catholic prelate and writer who served as Auxiliary Bishop of Freiburg from 1894 until his death in 1921.

== Early life and education ==
Justus Knecht was born in Bruchsal, the fourth of seven children of Heinrich Ludwig Knecht, a master tailor, and Catharina Schmer. He attended elementary school from 1843 to 1849 and high school from 1849 to 1856.

Knecht was baptized a Protestant but converted to the Catholic faith in 1855 at his mother's request, along with his father and three siblings. After finishing high school in 1858, he studied Catholic theology in Freiburg im Breisgau (1858–1861). In 1861 he entered the seminary in Sankt Peter and was ordained a priest there on 5 August 1862 by Archbishop Hermann von Vicari.

== Career ==
From 1862 to 1864 Knecht worked as a vicar in Durmersheim, Rastatt and Freiburg. He was also a tutor at the archbishop's seminary for boys and a religion teacher in a school in Freiburg.

From 1869 to 1871 he was an administrator in Gengenbach, in 1871 a parish administrator in Seelbach, and finally from 1871 to 1877 a pastor in Reichenbach/Lahr. During this time he was appointed to be the archbishop's school inspector and intervened in the disputes between church and state in the Kulturkampf. From 1879 to 1882 he was pastor in Schuttertal, and in 1882 Archbishop Johann Baptist Orbin appointed him to his cathedral chapter and entrusted him with the schools and religious education in the Archdiocese of Freiburg. In the same year Knecht published his Practical Commentary on Biblical History, which remained in use in German-speaking regions for an entire generation. This was followed in the same year by the publication of a Brief Biblical History for Catholic elementary schools. This textbook was extremely popular in its day and has been translated into 20 different languages. His Practical Commentary on Biblical History, translated in 1925, was one of the foundations for the Catholic mission in China. In 1907, his Biblical History for Schools and Homes was published.

In 1893 he received from Pope Leo XIII the honorary title of "Papal secret chamberlain" and was appointed titular bishop of Neve and auxiliary bishop in Freiburg on 4 February 1894. He was ordained a bishop on 4 April of the same year.

Following the death of Archbishop Johann Baptist Orbin in 1886, Knecht was considered a possible successor, but was removed from the list of candidates by the Baden state government. In 1896, he was appointed Dean of the Cathedral of Freiburg and thus, as vicar, head of the cathedral chapter. After the death of Archbishop Johannes Christian Roos in 1896, he served as regent of the Archdiocese for two years until 1898.

== Honours ==
Knecht was awarded the title of "Papal Assistant to the Throne and Comes Romanus" in 1903. In recognition of his services as a religious education teacher and his successful literary activities, the Bruchsal city council awarded him honorary citizenship on the occasion of his approaching 80th birthday on 2 October 1919.

== Death ==
Knecht died in Freiburg on 31 January 1921, at the age of 81, and was buried in the same city on 3 February.
