= Joseph Weyland (bishop) =

English overseas possessions
- Bishop of Fulda
- Church: Catholic Church
- Diocese: Diocese of Fulda
- In office: 25 November 1887 – 11 January 1894
- Predecessor: Georg von Kopp
- Successor: Georg Ignaz Komp

Orders
- Ordination: 6 September 1848
- Consecration: 25 January 1888 by Christian Roos

Personal details
- Born: 13 March 1826 Hadamar, Duchy of Nassau, German Confederation
- Died: 11 January 1894 (aged 67) Fulda, Province of Hesse-Nassau, Kingdom of Prussia, German Empire

Joseph Weyland (13 March 1826, Hadamar - 11 January 1894, Fulda) was a bishop of the Roman Catholic Diocese of Fulda from 1887 to 1894.

== Biography ==
After graduation in Weilburg in 1844, Weyland studied at the Catholic Theological Department of the University of Giessen, and finished his studies at the priests' seminary in Limburg an der Lahn. He was ordained priest in 1848 in Limburg Cathedral by the bishop of Limburg, Peter Josef Blum (1808–1884).

He was a chaplain in Oberursel, Rennerod, and Frankfurt-Höchst, and from January 1852 he was chaplain in Frankfurt Cathedral. After a few years in Lorch, he became parson (1862) and later dean (1863) of Wiesbaden. In 1882 he was appointed prelate by Pope Leo XIII.

On 5 January 1887, the Fulda chapter elected him to succeed bishop Georg von Kopp, who had been appointed Prince-bishop of Breslau (1887–1914). He was ordained on 25 January 1888 by the archbishop of Freiburg im Breisgau, Christian Roos (1826–1894).

He is buried in Fulda Cathedral.

== See also ==
Catholic Church titles
Preceded by Georg von Kopp	Bishop of Fulda; 1887 - 1894	Succeeded by Georg Ignaz Komp
