= Algermissen (surname) =

Algermissen is a surname. Notable people with the surname include:

- Heinz Josef Algermissen (born 1943), German Roman Catholic bishop
- Jo Ann Algermissen (1942–2009), American writer of contemporary romance novels
