= Oberkirch (Baden) =

- City
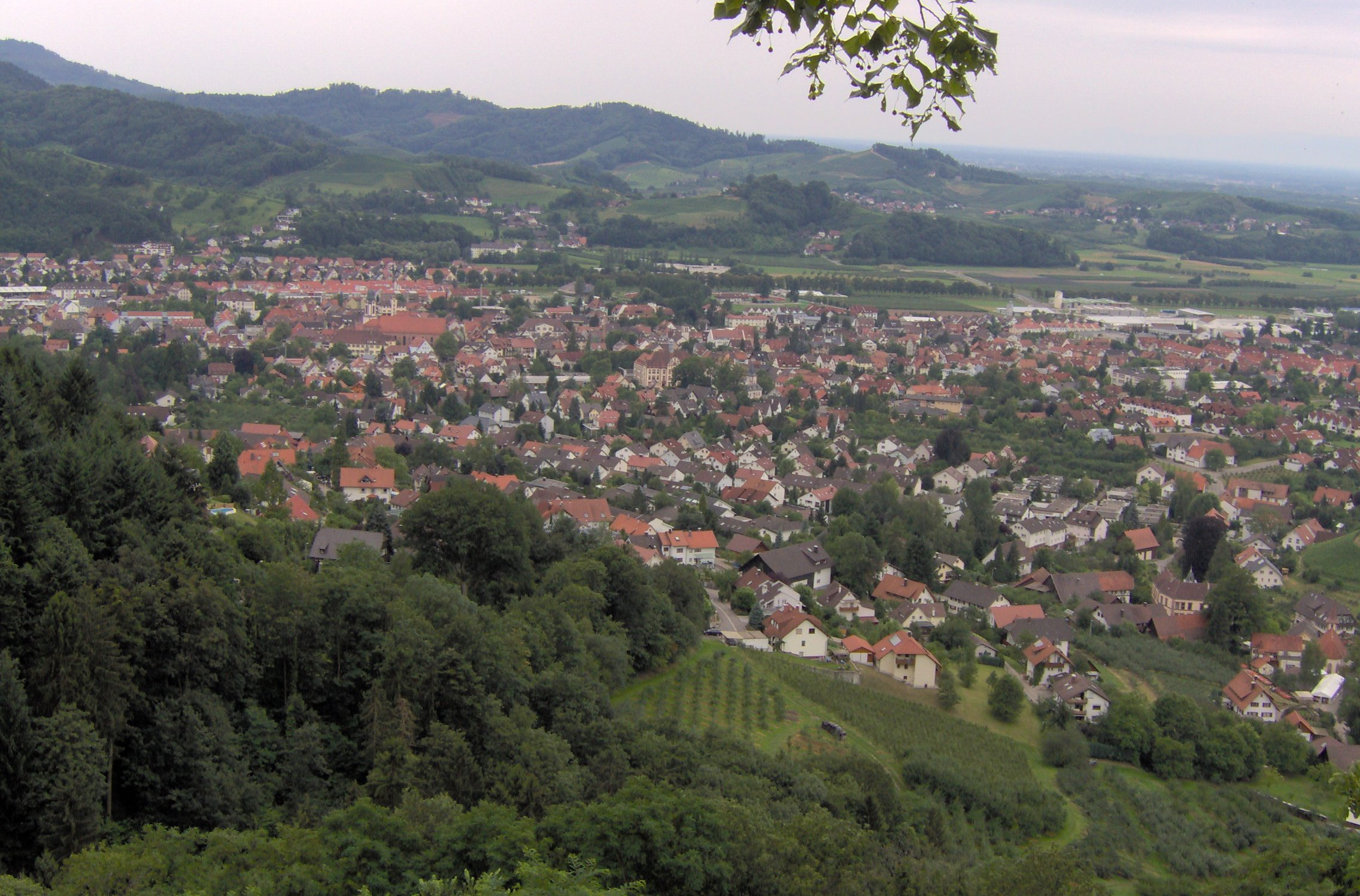
- Oberkirch

- Coat of arms

- Location of Oberkirch within Ortenaukreis district
- Interactive map of Oberkirch
- Location within Germany Location within Baden-Württemberg
- Coordinates: 48°32′N 8°5′E
- Country: Germany
- State: Baden-Württemberg
- Admin. region: Freiburg
- District: Ortenaukreis
- Subdivisions: Kernstadt and 9 Stadtteile

Government
  - Mayor (2023–31): Gregor Bühler (CDU)

Area
  - Total: 69.09 km^{2} (26.68 sq mi)
- Elevation: 192 m (630 ft)

Population (2025-12-31)
  - Total: 19,977
  - Density: 289.1/km^{2} (748.9/sq mi)
- Time zone: UTC+01:00 (CET)
  - Summer (DST): UTC+02:00 (CEST)
- Postal codes: 77695–77704
- Dialling codes: 07802 und 07805
- Vehicle registration: OG, BH, KEL, LR, WOL
- Website: www.oberkirch.de

Oberkirch (German pronunciation: [ˈoːbɐkɪʁç]; Low Alemannic: Owerkirch) is a city in Western Baden-Württemberg, Germany about 12 km North-East of Offenburg and belongs to the Ortenaukreis district.

== Twin towns ==
Oberkirch is twinned with Haverfordwest which is a town in Pembrokeshire, in Wales in the United Kingdom, and Oosterzele, a town in Oost-Vlaanderen, in Belgium.

== Gallery ==
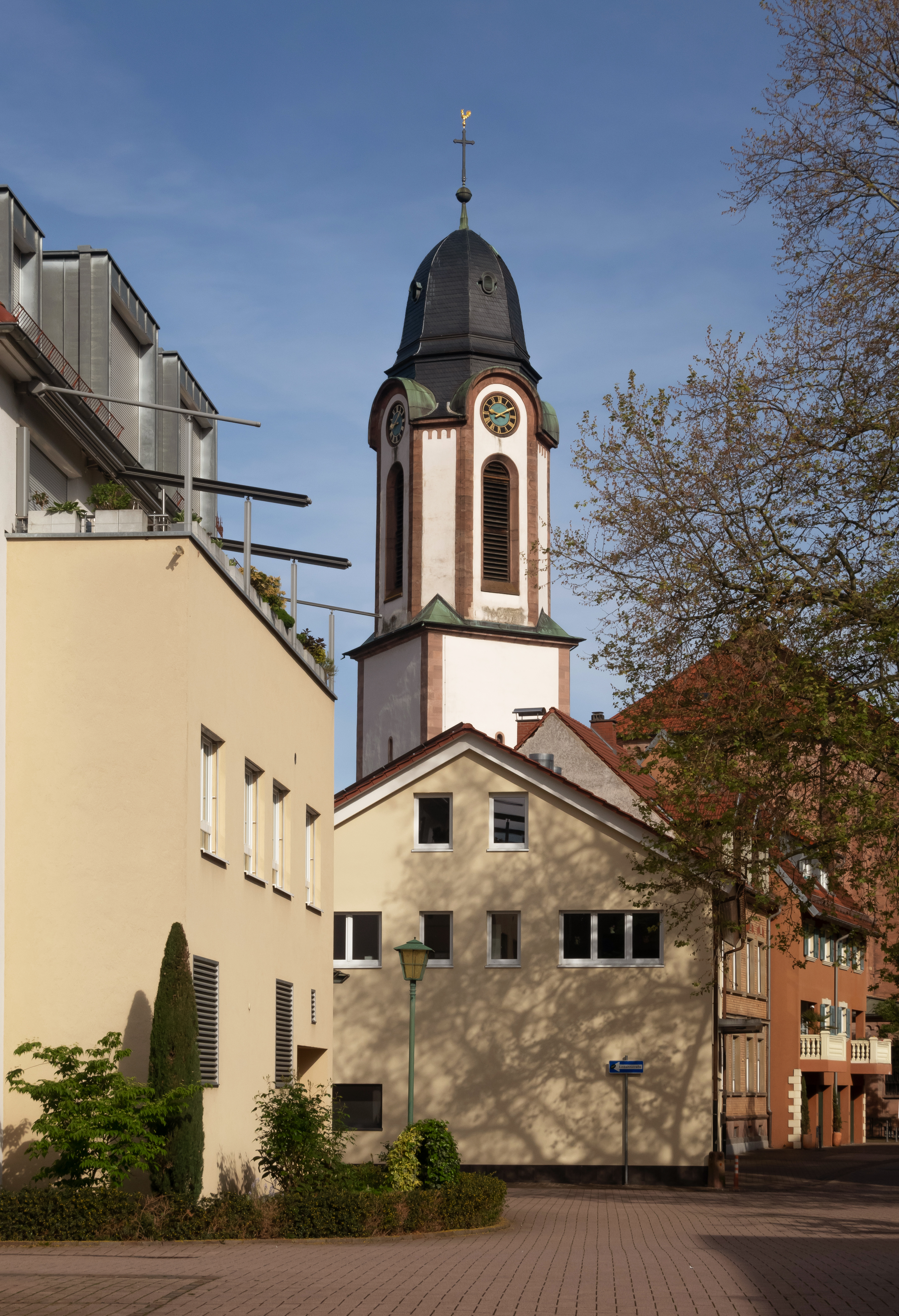
Churchtower (Sankt Cyriak Kirche) in Oberkirch

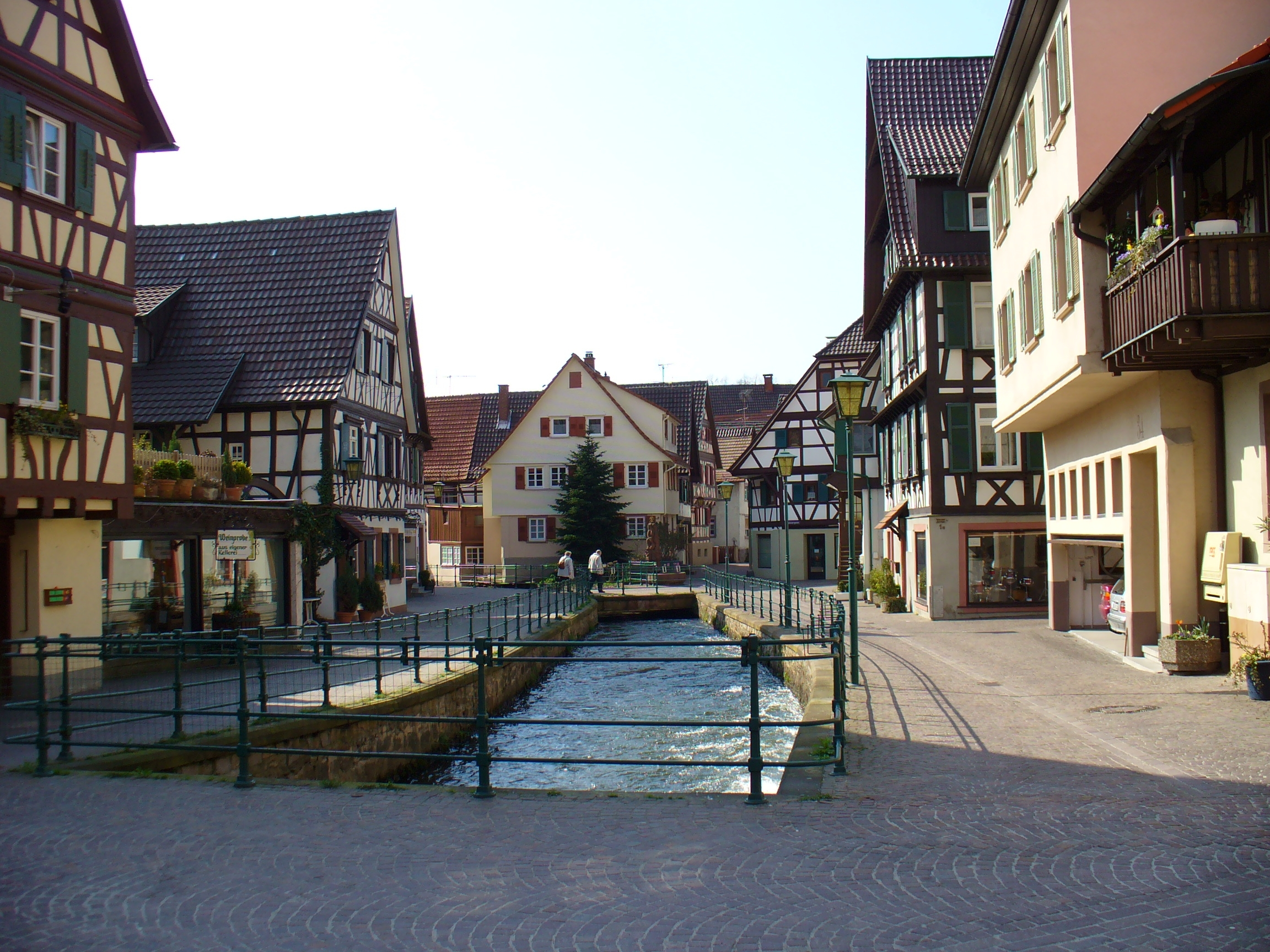
Mühlbach channel in the historic city center

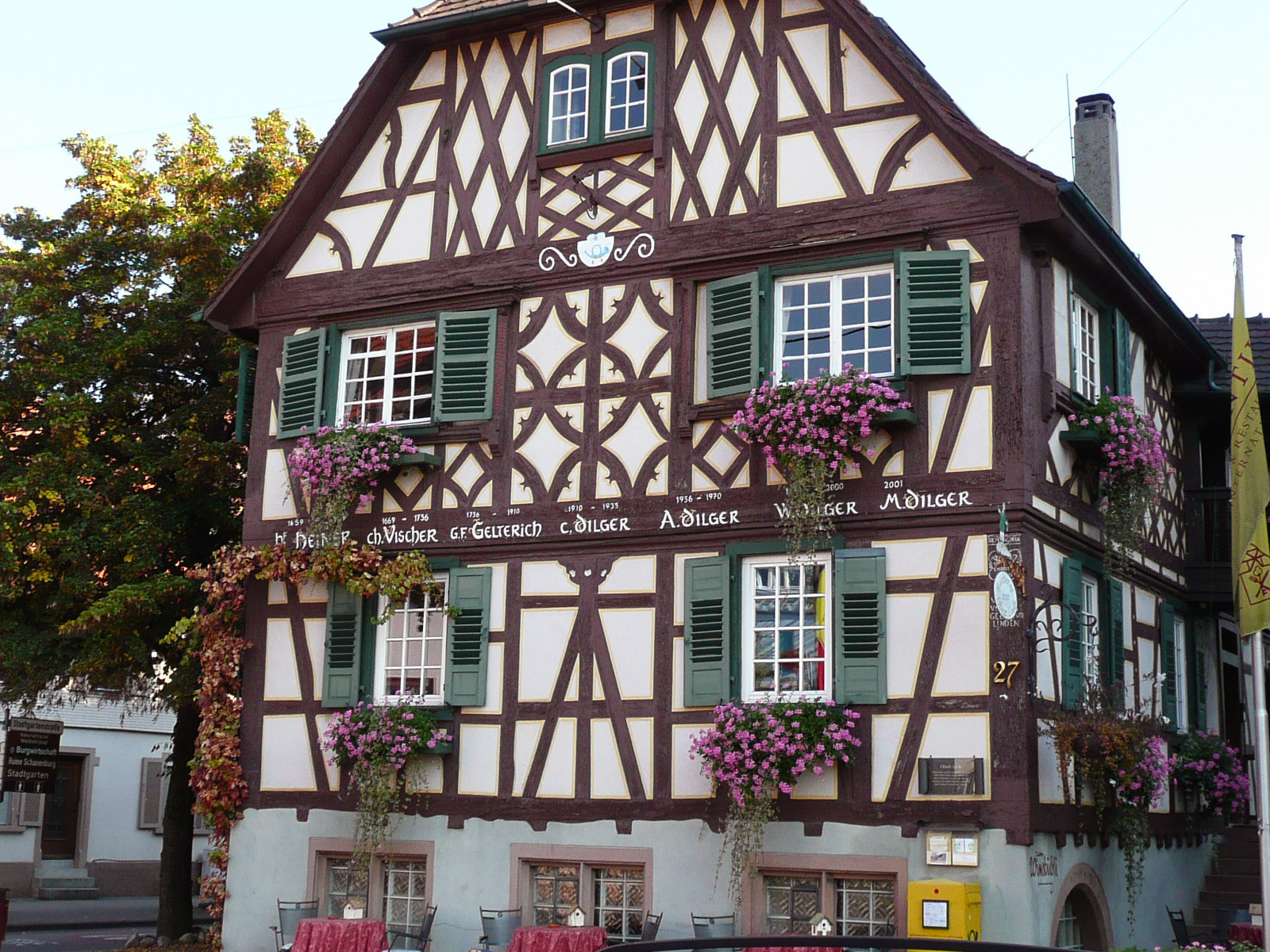
Historical facade from 1659

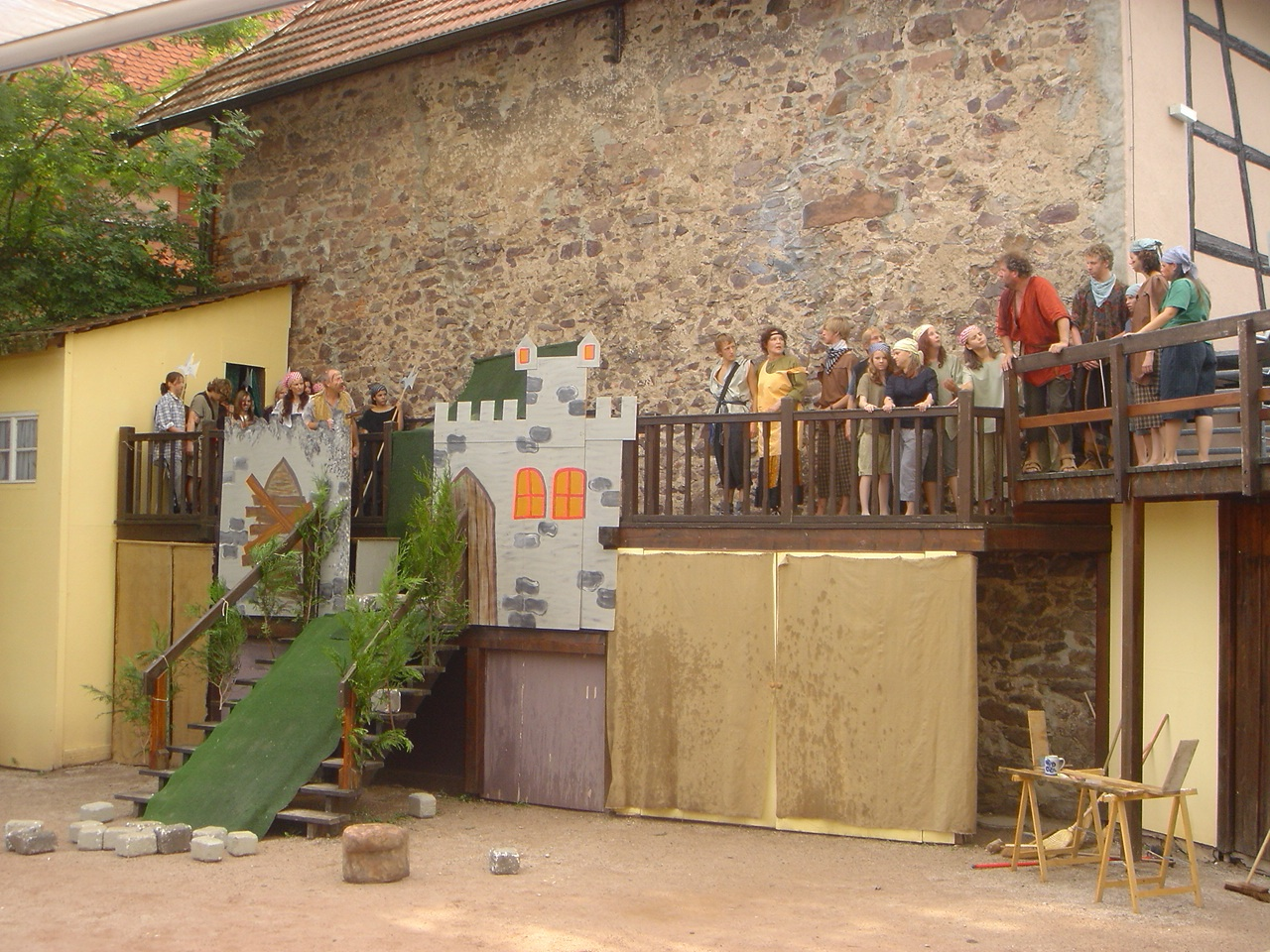
"Ronia the Robber's Daughter" at an open-air theater (2006)

== Notable people ==
- Karl Stecher (1831-1923), painter, moved to Paris, New York & Wichita, Kansas
- Bernhard Maier (born 1963), professor of religious studies, publishes mainly on Celtic culture and religion.
- Michael Gerber (born 1970), Roman Catholic bishop (of Fulda)
