= Michael Gerber (bishop) =

German Roman Catholic bishop

His Excellency Michael Gerber
- Bishop of Fulda
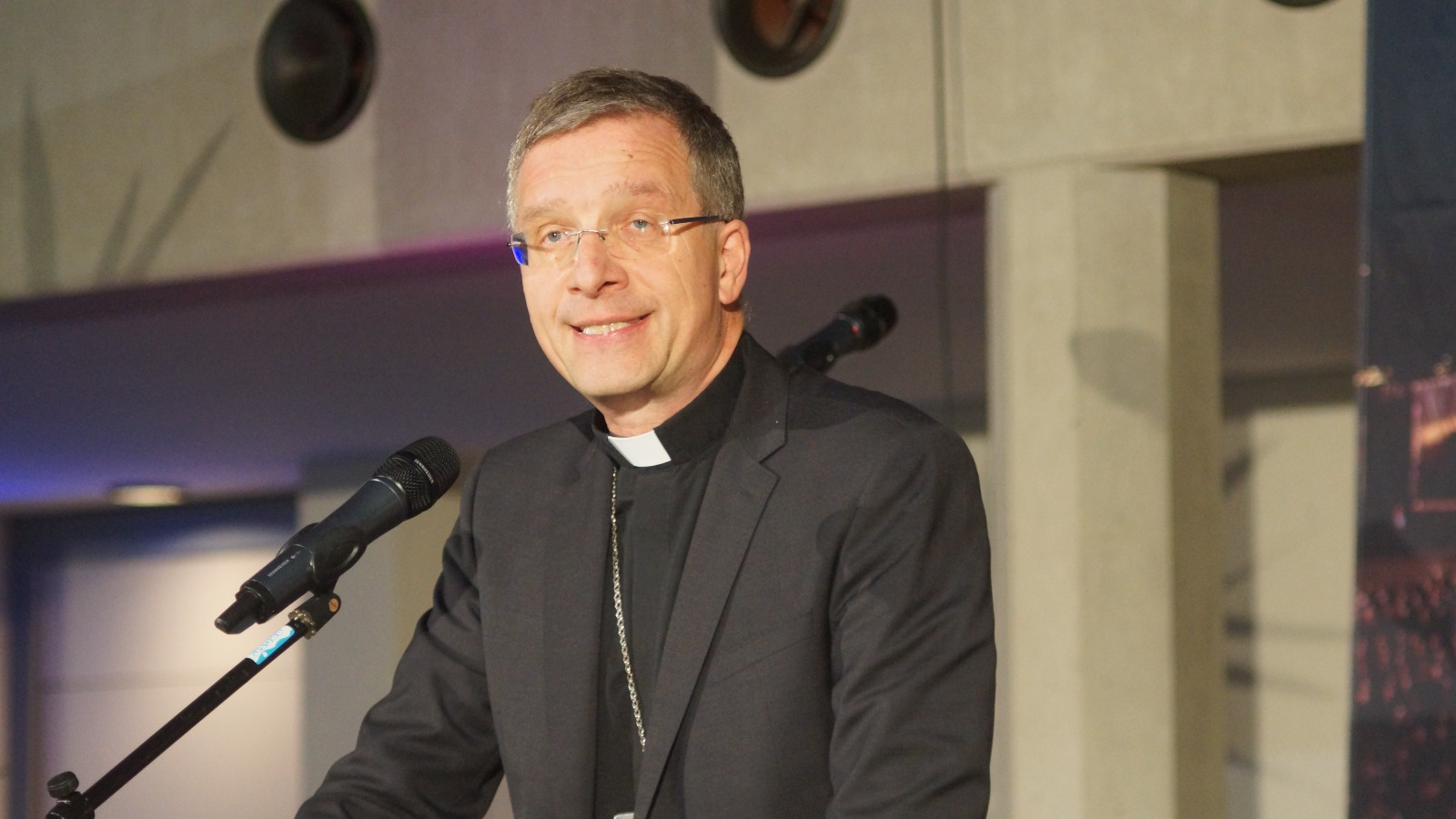
- Church: Roman Catholic
- Diocese: Diocese of Fulda
- Appointed: 13 December 2018
- Installed: 31 March 2019
- Predecessor: Heinz Josef Algermissen

Orders
- Ordination: 11 May 1997
- Consecration: 8 September 2013 by Robert Zollitsch

Personal details
- Born: January 15, 1970 (age 56) Germany
- Denomination: Roman Catholic
- Residence: Fulda
- Motto: Tecum in foedere
- Coat of arms

Michael Gerber (born January 15, 1970, in Oberkirch) is a German Roman Catholic bishop of Roman Catholic Diocese of Fulda.

== Life ==
Gerber studied Catholic theology and philosophy. On 11 May 1997 Gerber was ordained priest in Freiburg im Breisgau. On 12 June 2013 Gerber was appointed as auxiliary bishop of Freiburg im Breisgau. On 8 September 2013 Gerber became titular bishop of Migirpa. On 31 March 2019 Gerber became bishop of Fulda.

== Positions ==
In June 2021 Gerber supported reforms at Synodal path in Germany. He supports women ordination, married priests and blessing for same-sex unions.

== Works by Gerber ==
- Zur Liebe berufen. Pastoraltheologische Kriterien für die Formung geistlicher Berufe in Auseinandersetzung mit Luigi M. Rulla und Josef Kentenich. Echter Verlag, Würzburg 2008, ISBN 978-3-429-02993-7 (dissertation).
- Barfuß klettern. Ermutigungen für Christen heute. Herder, Freiburg 2015, ISBN 978-3-451-38821-7.
