= Johann Adam Rieger =

- Bishop of Fulda
- Church: Catholic Church
- Diocese: Diocese of Fulda
- In office: 23 June 1828 – 30 July 1831
- Predecessor: Heinrich von Warnsdorf
- Successor: Johann Leonhard Pfaff

Orders
- Ordination: 19 December 1778
- Consecration: 21 September 1828 by Johann Baptist von Keller

Personal details
- Born: 16 July 1753 Orb, Electorate of Mainz, Electoral Rhenish Circle, Holy Roman Empire
- Died: 30 July 1831 (aged 78) Fulda, Electorate of Hesse, German Confederation

Johann Adam Rieger (16 July 1753, Orb – 30 July 1831, Fulda) was a bishop of the Roman Catholic Diocese of Fulda from 1812 to 1831.

== Biography ==
=== Education ===
Rieger studied at the Jesuit Gymnasium in Mannheim and Worms, and then studied philosophy in Heidelberg and theology in Mainz. On 19 December 1778 he was ordained as priest in Mainz.

=== Priesthood ===
Rieger began his career in the church as parochial vicar in various places, including Marburg-Bauerbach, until he became chaplain in 1781 and then preacher at the court of Landgrave Frederick II in Kassel, and from 1795 on parson.

=== Canon and Grand Almoner ===
In 1798, Rieger became canon in Amöneburg, and in 1808 he was appointed Grand Almoner of France by King Jérôme Bonaparte of Westphalia. When the last abbot and Prince-Bishop of Fulda, Adalbert von Harstall, died in 1814, Fulda was without a successor until 1829.

=== Bishop ===
On 23 June 1828 Rieger, at age 76, was appointed bishop of the newly established diocese of Fulda. He was ordained on 21 September 1829 by Johann Baptist von Keller. He established some of his principles in his first pastoral letter. During his short tenure as bishop, he acted contrary to the decisions of the Landgraviate of Hesse-Kassel on a number of occasions, including:

- In August 1830, when he declared himself against the government's dictum on the right of patronage;
- In January 1831 he spoke against the constitution of 6 January 1831;
- In July 1831 he fulminated against the establishment of a theological faculty at the University of Marburg.

Catholic Church titles
| Preceded by Heinrich Freiherr (Philipp Ernst) von Warnsdorf | Bishop of Fulda; 1828 - 1831 | Succeeded by Johann Leonhard Pfaff |
