= Georg Ignaz Komp =

- Archbishop of Freiburg im Breisgau
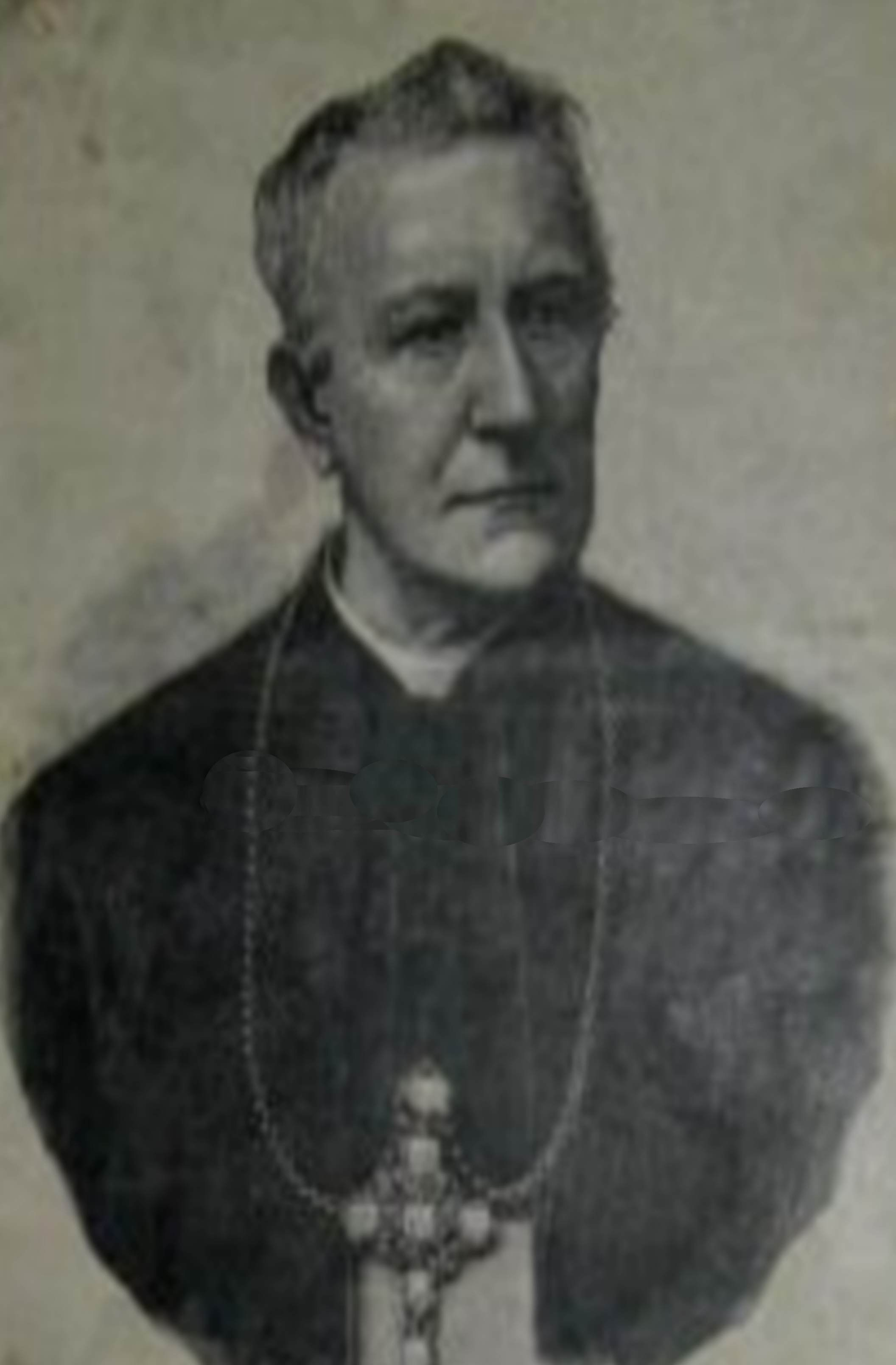
- Church: Catholic Church
- Archdiocese: Archdiocese of Freiburg im Breisgau
- In office: 24 March 1898 – 11 May 1898
- Predecessor: Christian Roos
- Successor: Thomas Nörber
- Previous post: Bishop of Fulda (1894-1898)

Orders
- Ordination: 12 June 1853
- Consecration: 25 July 1894 by Christian Roos

Personal details
- Born: 5 June 1828 Hammelburg, Kingdom of Bavaria, German Confederation
- Died: 11 May 1898 (aged 69) Mainz, Grand Duchy of Hesse, German Empire
- Coat of arms

Georg Ignaz Komp (5 June 1828, in Hammelburg – 11 May 1898, in Mainz) was a Roman Catholic clergyman who was Bishop of Fulda. He was appointed Archbishop of Freiburg but died en route to his enthronement.

== Sources ==
- David M. Cheney. "Archbishop Georg Ignatz Komp". Catholic Hierarchy. ^{[self-published]}

Catholic Church titles
Preceded by Joseph Weyland	Bishop of Fulda; 1894–1898	Succeeded by Adalbert Endert
Preceded by Christian Roos	Archbishop of Freiburg; 1898	Succeeded by Thomas Nörber
