= Johannes Dyba =

German prelate

- Archbishop of Fulda
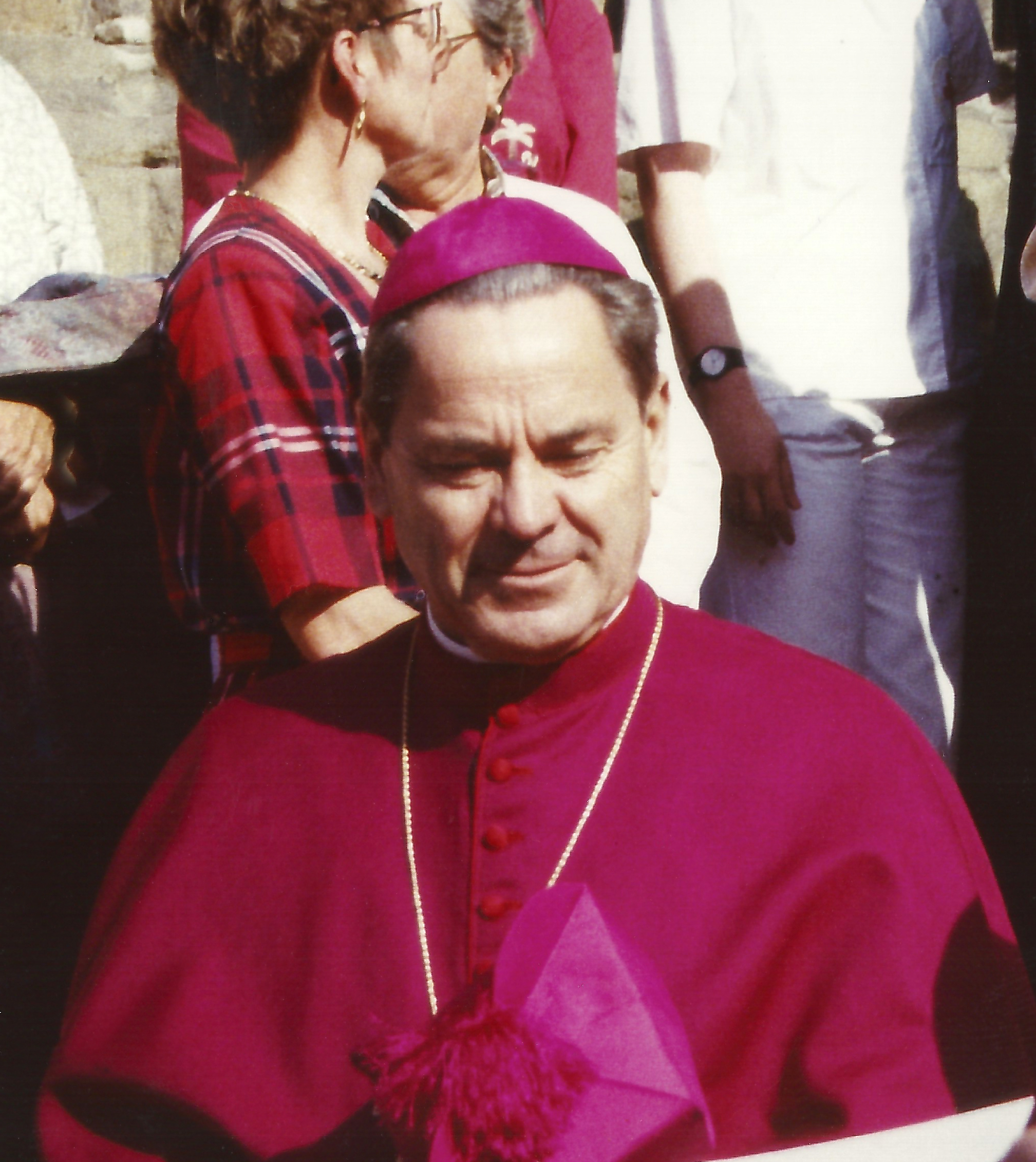
- Johannes Dyba in 1995
- Church: Catholic Church
- Diocese: Diocese of Fulda
- In office: 1 June 1983 – 23 July 2000
- Predecessor: Eduard Schick
- Successor: Heinz Josef Algermissen
- Other post: Military Ordinary of Germany (1990-2000)
- Previous posts: Titular Archbishop of Neapolis in Proconsulari (1979-1983); Apostolic Delegate to Sierra Leone & Guinea (1979-1983); Apostolic Pro-Nuncio to Liberia & Gambia (1979-1983)

Orders
- Ordination: 2 February 1959
- Consecration: 13 October 1979 by Agostino Casaroli

Personal details
- Born: 15 September 1929 Berlin, Free State of Prussia, German Reich
- Died: 23 July 2000 (aged 70) Fulda, Hesse, Germany
- Coat of arms

Johannes Dyba (15 September 1929 – 23 July 2000) was a German prelate of the Catholic Church who led the Diocese of Fulda from 1983 until his death. He spent his earlier career in the diplomatic service of the Holy See.

== Biography ==
Johannes Dyba was born in Berlin, Germany, on 15 September 1929. He was ordained a priest on 2 February 1959.

To prepare for a diplomatic career he entered the Pontifical Ecclesiastical Academy in 1960.

On 25 August 1979, Pope John Paul II named him a titular archbishop, Apostolic Pro-Nuncio to Gambia and to Liberia, and Apostolic Delegate to Guinea and to Sierra Leone. He received his episcopal consecration from Cardinal Agostino Casaroli on 13 October 1979.

On 1 June 1983, Pope John Paul named him Bishop of Fulda, allowing him to continue to use the personal title of Archbishop.

On 15 December 1990, Dyba was appointed Military Ordinary of Germany. (Note: The appointment said Dyba was a member of the Central Office of Military Ordinaries.)

Dyba died in Fulda of heart failure on 23 July 2000.
