= Christoph Florentius Kött =

- Bishop of Fulda
- Church: Catholic Church
- Diocese: Diocese of Fulda
- In office: 11 December 1848 – 17 October 1873
- Predecessor: Johann Leonhard Pfaff
- Successor: Georg von Kopp

Orders
- Ordination: 18 December 1824
- Consecration: 1 May 1849 by Hermann von Vicari

Personal details
- Born: 7 November 1801 Saint-Martin, Bas-Rhin, France
- Died: 17 October 1873 (aged 71) Fulda, Province of Hesse-Nassau, Kingdom of Prussia, German Empire

Christoph Florentius Kött (7 November 1801, in St. Martin – 17 October 1873, in Fulda) was a bishop of the Roman Catholic Diocese of Fulda from 1848 to 1873.

Kött was ordained as priest on 18 December 1824. On 29 March 1848 he was appointed as bishop of Fulda. He was confirmed on 11 December 1848 and ordained on 1 May 1849. During his tenure he ordained the future bishop Adalbert Endert as priest, on 6 April 1873. Kött re-founded the boys' seminary, which was housed together with the seminary for priests in the former cloister building. Kött was arrested in 1873, during the Kulturkampf, for protesting the laws that gave the state far-reaching influence on the seminary. In the end, this conflict would lead to the disbanding of the boys' seminary (1873) and the priests' seminary (December 1874). For years afterward the bishop's seat in Fulda remained empty. Kött died in Fulda, shortly after his arrest.

Preceded by Johann Leonhard Pfaff	Bishop of Fulda; 1848 - 1873	Succeeded by Georg von Kopp
