= Eduard Schick =

German Roman Catholic bishop

- Bishop of Fulda
- Church: Catholic Church
- Diocese: Diocese of Fulda
- In office: 18 December 1974 – 1 July 1982
- Predecessor: Adolf Bolte
- Successor: Johannes Dyba
- Previous posts: Titular Bishop of Aradi (1962-1974); Auxiliary Bishop of Fulda (1962-1974)

Orders
- Ordination: 22 December 1928
- Consecration: 11 May 1962 by Adolf Bolte

Personal details
- Born: 23 February 1906 Mardorf (near Amöneburg), Province of Hesse-Nassau, Kingdom of Prussia, German Empire
- Died: 20 November 2000 (aged 94) Lauterbach, Hesse, Germany
- Coat of arms

Eduard Schick (23 February 1906 - 20 November 2000) was a German Roman Catholic bishop. He was bishop of the Roman Catholic Diocese of Fulda from 1974 to 1982.
