= Karl Stecher =

German painter (1831–1923)

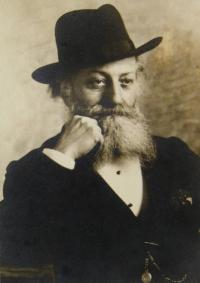
- Born: 5 March 1831; Oberkirch, Grand Duchy of Baden
- Died: 27 December 1923 (aged 92); Wichita, Kansas, U.S
- Known for: Stained glass windows in Little Church Around the Corner
- Movement: Realism

Karl Franz Stecher, also known as Charles F. Stecher or Stetcher (5 March 1831 - 27 December 1923) was a German painter.

== Life ==
Stecher first studied painting and music in Karlsruhe, Germany. Afterwards he moved to Paris where he did figures for stained glass windows and painted watercolours. Later in life Stecher claimed that in Paris he had been visited by and played organ for Napoleon III, and also had befriended Realist artists like Rosa Bonheur and Jean-François Millet. In 1874 he moved to New York where he designed all the windows for Church of the Transfiguration in Manhattan. Stecher appears to have worked for lithographic Schumacher & Ettlinger company. In 1885 a painting executed by Stecher, and designed by Theodore Schumacher became an object of a copyright lawsuit Schumacher v Schwencke. 5 years before his death Stecher moved with his son to Wichita in Kansas, where he continued painting into his 90s. In Wichita he made a reputation as a portrait artist, but also as a painting and book collector with wide interests. He is buried in Old Mission Cemetery in Wichita.

== Gallery ==
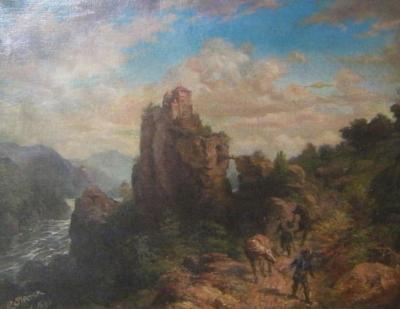
Along the Danube

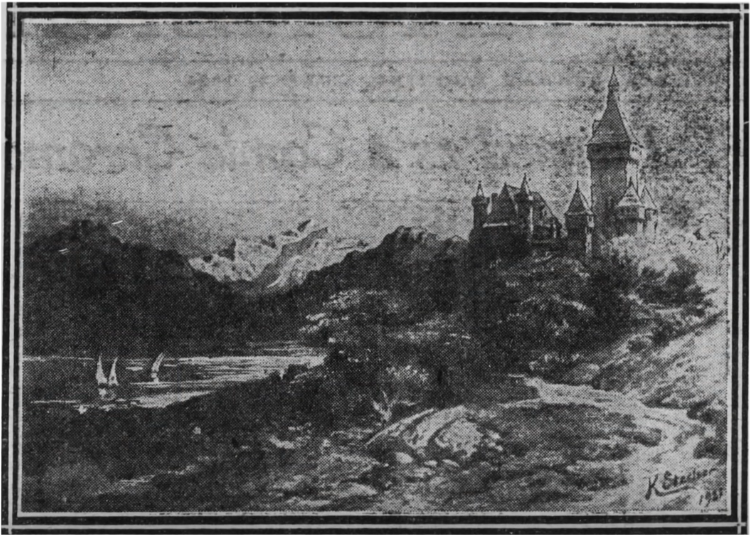

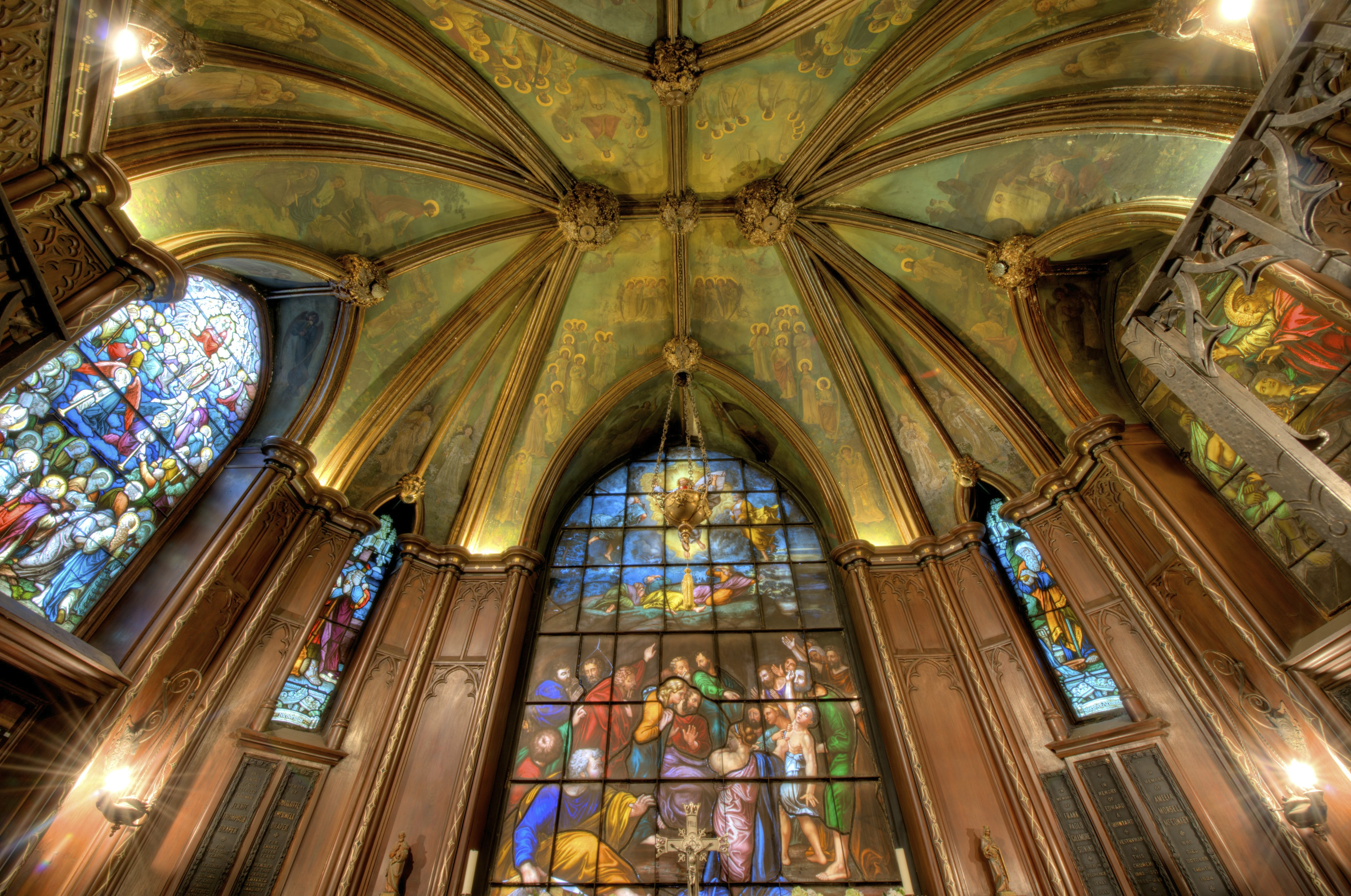
Stained glass from Little Church Around the Corner
