= Johann Leonhard Pfaff =

- Bishop of Fulda
- Church: Catholic Church
- Diocese: Diocese of Fulda
- In office: 24 February 1832 – 3 January 1848
- Predecessor: Johann Adam Rieger
- Successor: Christoph Florentius Kött

Orders
- Ordination: 22 September 1798
- Consecration: 2 September 1832 by Adam Friedrich Groß zu Trockau

Personal details
- Born: 18 August 1775 Hünfeld, Prince-Bishopric of Fulda, Upper Rhenish Circle, Holy Roman Empire
- Died: 3 January 1848 (aged 72) Fulda, Electorate of Hesse, German Confederation

Johann Leonhard Pfaff (18 August 1775 in Hünfeld - 3 January 1848 in Fulda) was a bishop of the Roman Catholic Diocese of Fulda from 1832 to 1848. During his tenure he revised the statutes for the education of priests in Fulda.

Pfaff was ordained as priest on 19 September 1798. On 15 November 1831 he was appointed bishop of Fulda. He was confirmed on 24 February 1832, and ordained on 2 September 1832 by the bishop of Würzburg, Adam Friedrich Groß zu Trockau.

Catholic Church titles
Preceded by Johann Adam Rieger	Bishop of Fulda; 1831 - 1848	Succeeded by Christoph Florentius Kött
