= Christian Roos =

German Roman Catholic clergyman

- Archbishop of Freiburg im Breisgau
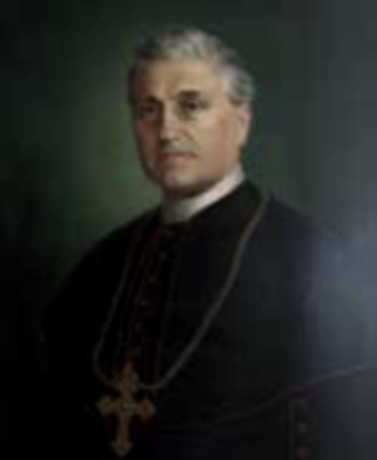
- Church: Catholic Church
- Archdiocese: Archdiocese of Freiburg im Breisgau
- In office: 27 July 1886 – 22 October 1896
- Predecessor: Johann Baptist Orbin
- Successor: Georg Ignaz Komp
- Previous post: Bishop of Limburg (1885-1886)

Orders
- Ordination: 22 August 1853
- Consecration: 17 May 1885 by Georg von Kopp

Personal details
- Born: Johannes Christian Roos; 28 April 1826 Kamp am Rhein, Duchy of Nassau, German Confederation
- Died: 22 October 1896 (aged 70) Freiburg im Breisgau, Grand Duchy of Baden, German Empire
- Coat of arms

Johannes Christian Roos (28 April 1826 in Kamp am Rhein – 22 October 1896 in Freiburg im Breisgau) was a German Roman Catholic clergyman. He was Bishop of Limburg from 1885 to 1886 and Archbishop of Freiburg from 1886 until his death ten years later.

== Bibliography (in German) ==
- Klaus Schatz: Geschichte des Bistums Limburg. Mainz 1983.
- Christoph Schmider: Die Freiburger Bischöfe: 175 Jahre Erzbistum Freiburg. Eine Geschichte in Lebensbildern. Freiburg i. Br.: Herder Verlag, 2002. ISBN 3-451-27847-2.

== Sources ==
- David M. Cheney. "Archbishop Johannes Christian Roos [Catholic-Hierarchy]". catholic-hierarchy.org. ^{[self-published]}

Catholic Church titles
Preceded by Peter Joseph Blum	Bishop of Limburg; 1885-1886	Succeeded by Karl Klein
Preceded by Johann Baptist Orbin	Archbishop of Freiburg; 1886–1896	Succeeded by Georg Ignaz Komp
