= Fulda Cathedral =

- The Cathedral of Christ the Saviour
- Fuldaer Dom
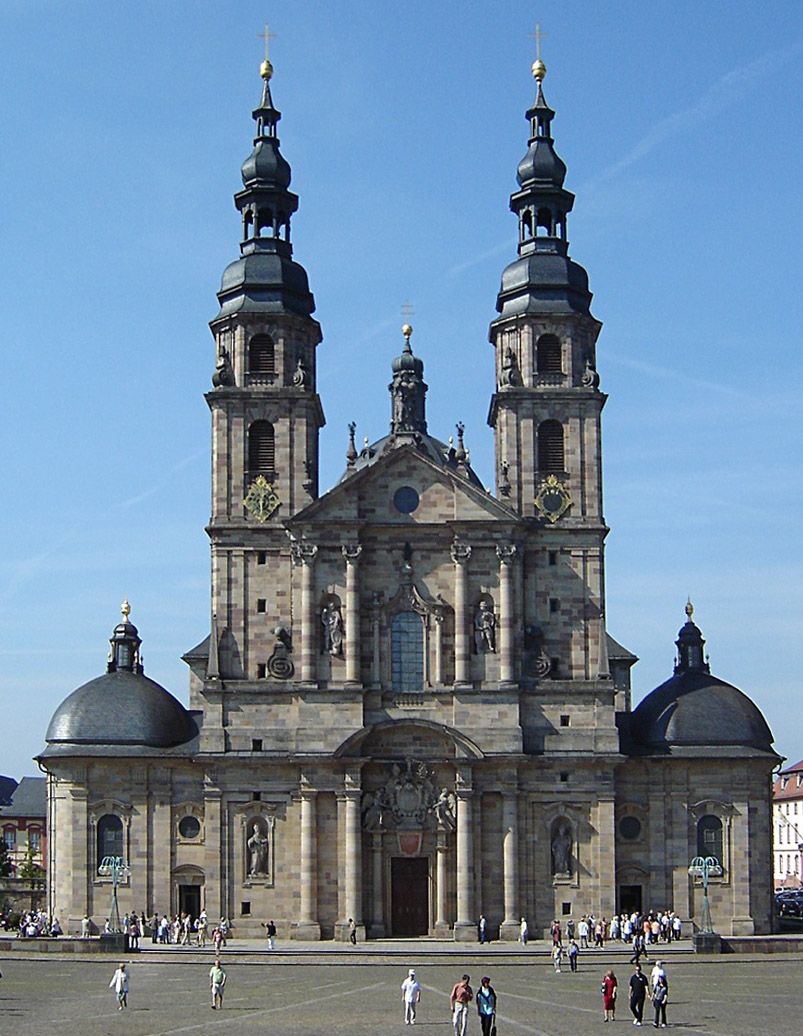
- Fulda Cathedral

- Location in Germany
- 50°33′14″N 9°40′18″E
- Location: Fulda
- Country: Germany
- Denomination: Catholic

History
- Former name: The Abbey Church of Fulda
- Status: Cathedral
- Founded: 23 April 1704
- Founder: Adalbert von Schleifras
- Dedication: Saint Boniface
- Dedicated: 15 August 1712

Architecture
- Functional status: Active
- Architect: Johann Dientzenhofer
- Architectural type: Church
- Style: Baroque
- Completed: 1712

Specifications
- Length: 99 m (324 ft 10 in)
- Height: 39 m (127 ft 11 in)

Administration
- Province: Paderborn
- Diocese: Fulda

Clergy
- Bishop: Michael Gerber

Fulda Cathedral (German: Fuldaer Dom, also Sankt Salvator) is the former abbey church of Fulda Abbey and the burial place of Saint Boniface. Since 1752 it has also been the cathedral of the Diocese of Fulda, of which the Prince-Abbots of Fulda were created bishops. The abbey was dissolved in 1802 but the diocese and its cathedral have continued. The dedication is to Christ the Saviour (Latin: Salvator). The cathedral constitutes the high point of the Baroque district of Fulda, and is a symbol of the town.

== History ==
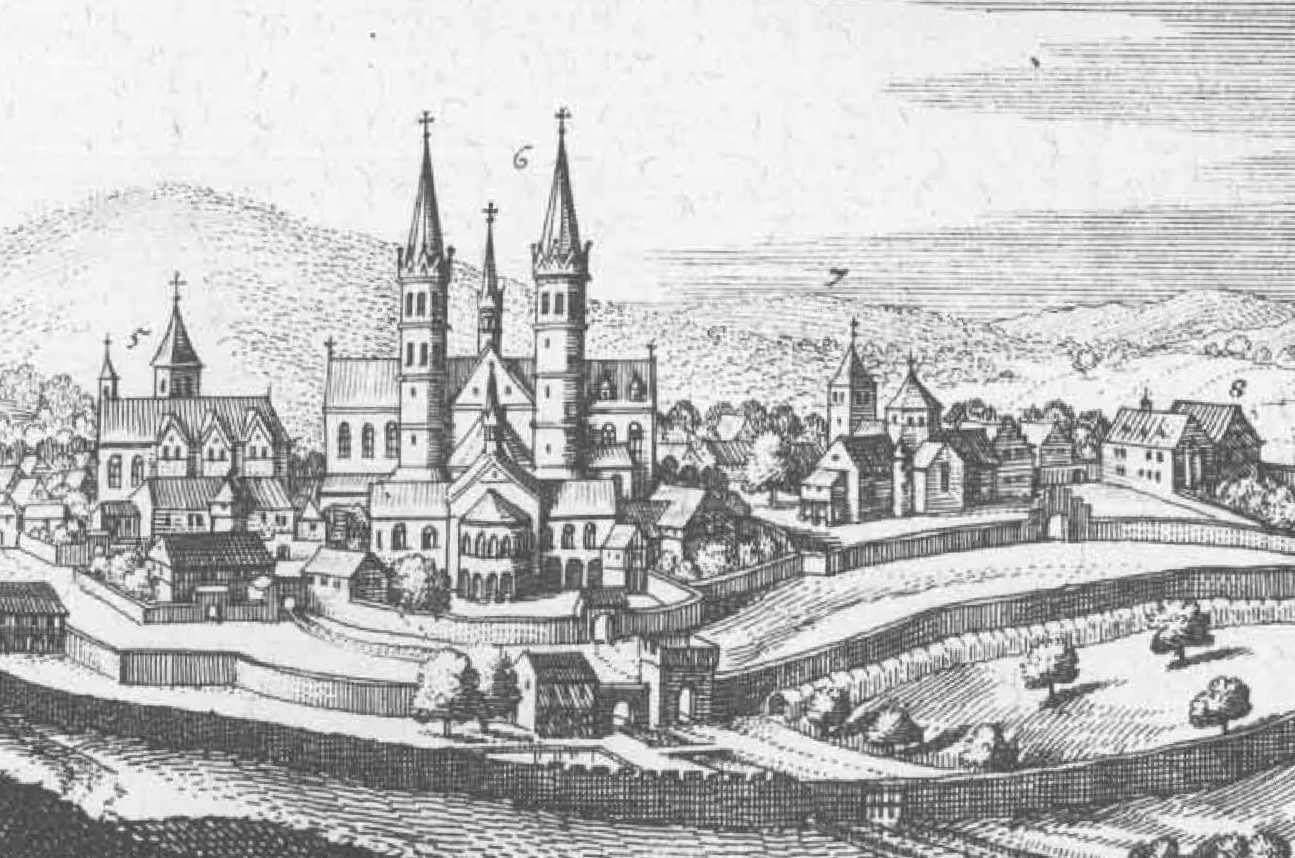
View of the abbey, showing in the centre the Ratgar Basilica, predecessor of the present cathedral (copper engraving 1655)

The present cathedral stands on the site of the Ratgar Basilica (once the largest basilica north of the Alps), which was the burial site of Saint Boniface and the church of Fulda Abbey, functions which the new building was intended to continue.

The plans of the new church were drawn up in 1700 by one of the greatest German Baroque architects, Johann Dientzenhofer, who was commissioned by the Prince-Abbot Adalbert von Schleifras for the new building on the recommendation of the Pope after Dientzenhofer's study trip to Rome in 1699. The deliberate similarity of the church's internal arrangement to that of St. Peter's Basilica in Rome is testimony to Dientzenhofer's visit.

The Ratgar Basilica was demolished to make way for the new Baroque structure, on which construction began on 23 April 1704 using in part the foundations of the earlier basilica. In 1707 the shell was completed. The roof was finished in 1708 and the interior in 1712. The new abbey church was dedicated on 15 August 1712. The dedication tablet placed on the facade by von Schleifras gives the dedication as Christus Salvator.

The new Baroque building, like its predecessor, served as the abbey church and the burial shrine of Saint Boniface. In 1752 it was elevated to a cathedral on the creation of the Diocese of Fulda. In 1802 Fulda Abbey was dissolved and the cathedral's function as the abbey church ceased, but it continued in operation as the seat of the Bishops of Fulda.

On 4 June 1905 during celebrations of the 1150th anniversary of the death of Saint Boniface a stray firework lodged in the righthand tower and started a fire (it is presumed to have set light to old jackdaws' nests). The tower was burnt out, and the bells Osanna and Bonifatius were destroyed. Other parts of the cathedral were not damaged.

After damage caused by air raids during World War II the cathedral was closed for restoration until 1954.

Pope John Paul II visited Fulda on 17 and 18 November 1980. More than 100,000 people were present on the cathedral square on 18 November to attend the open-air mass celebrated by the Pope.

== Architecture ==
=== Orientation ===
Like the Ratgar Basilica before it, and St. Peter's in Rome, but unlike the great majority of European churches, Fulda Cathedral is oriented to the west. The main facade onto the cathedral square is the east front, and the choir is located at the west end of the nave. (The Ratgar Basilica had a second choir to the east, which Dientzenhofer did not replicate in his new building).

=== Dimensions ===
The cathedral is 99 meters long and 39 meters high into the top of the dome. The main frontage is flanked by two towers 65 meters high.

=== Form and ground plan ===
The building is a basilica, with a central aisle and two side aisles, and two transepts separated by the crossing, over which is the dome. The ground plan is thus a cross with double arms. The nave is extended to the east by the addition of an entrance hall, the two facade towers and two domed chapels (St. Andrew's Chapel and St. John's Chapel). Beyond the crossing and the northern transept the chancel continues, with the high altar and beyond it the choir, with the crypt of Saint Boniface beneath. The side aisles run parallel to the main aisle up to the sacristy and the Lady Chapel, which is directly adjacent to the former monastic buildings.

=== Exterior ===
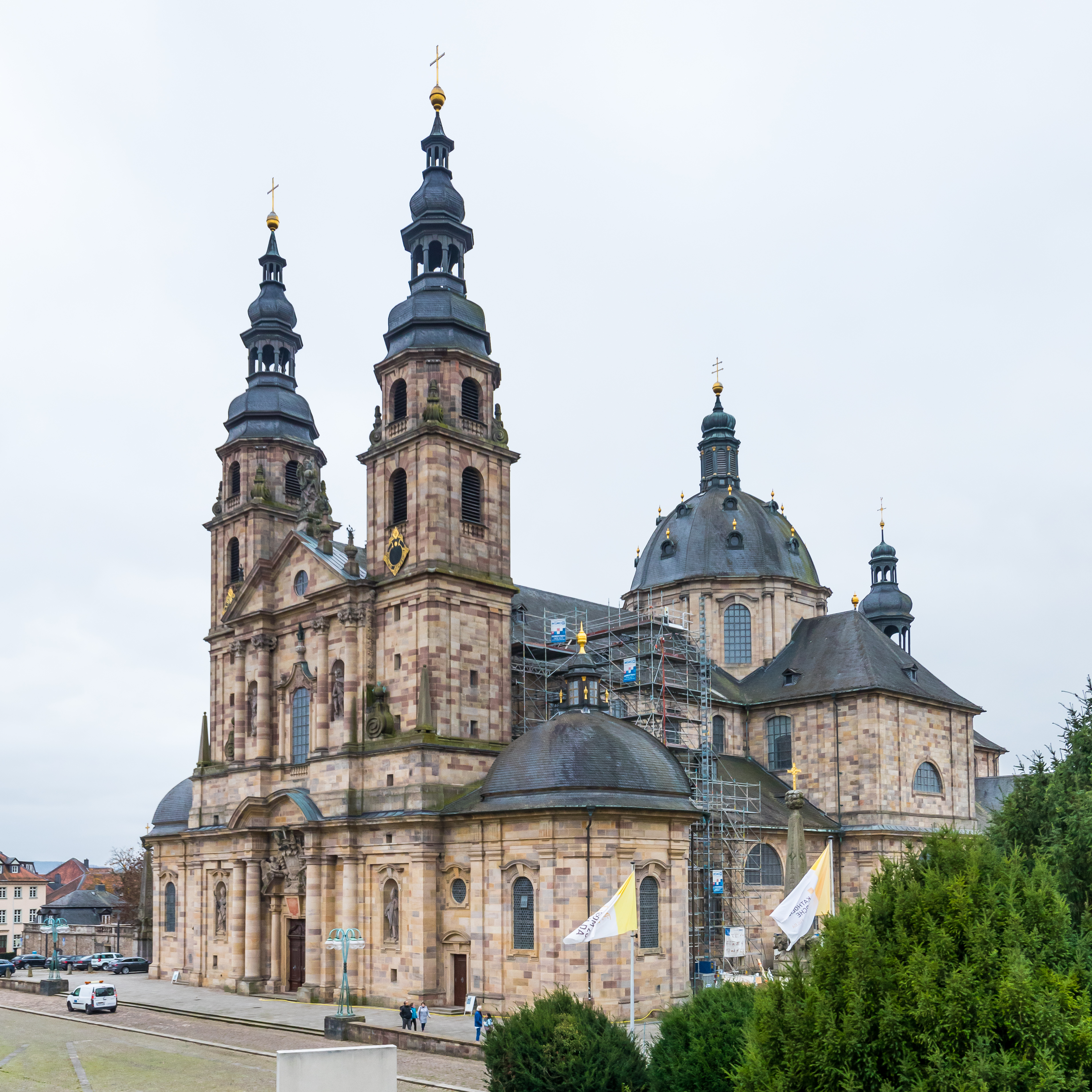
Exterior

==== Bell towers ====
The facade is flanked by two towers 65 metres high, the four storeys of which are clearly delineated by ledges. Sandstone statues, greater than life size, by Andreas Balthasar Weber, represent to the right Saint Sturm as abbot, with a mitre, abbot's staff and book, and to the left Saint Boniface as bishop with a crook and a Bible pierced by a dagger. On the third storey are copper and gilt numerals and hands belonging to a mechanical clock and a sundial.

==== Main portal ====
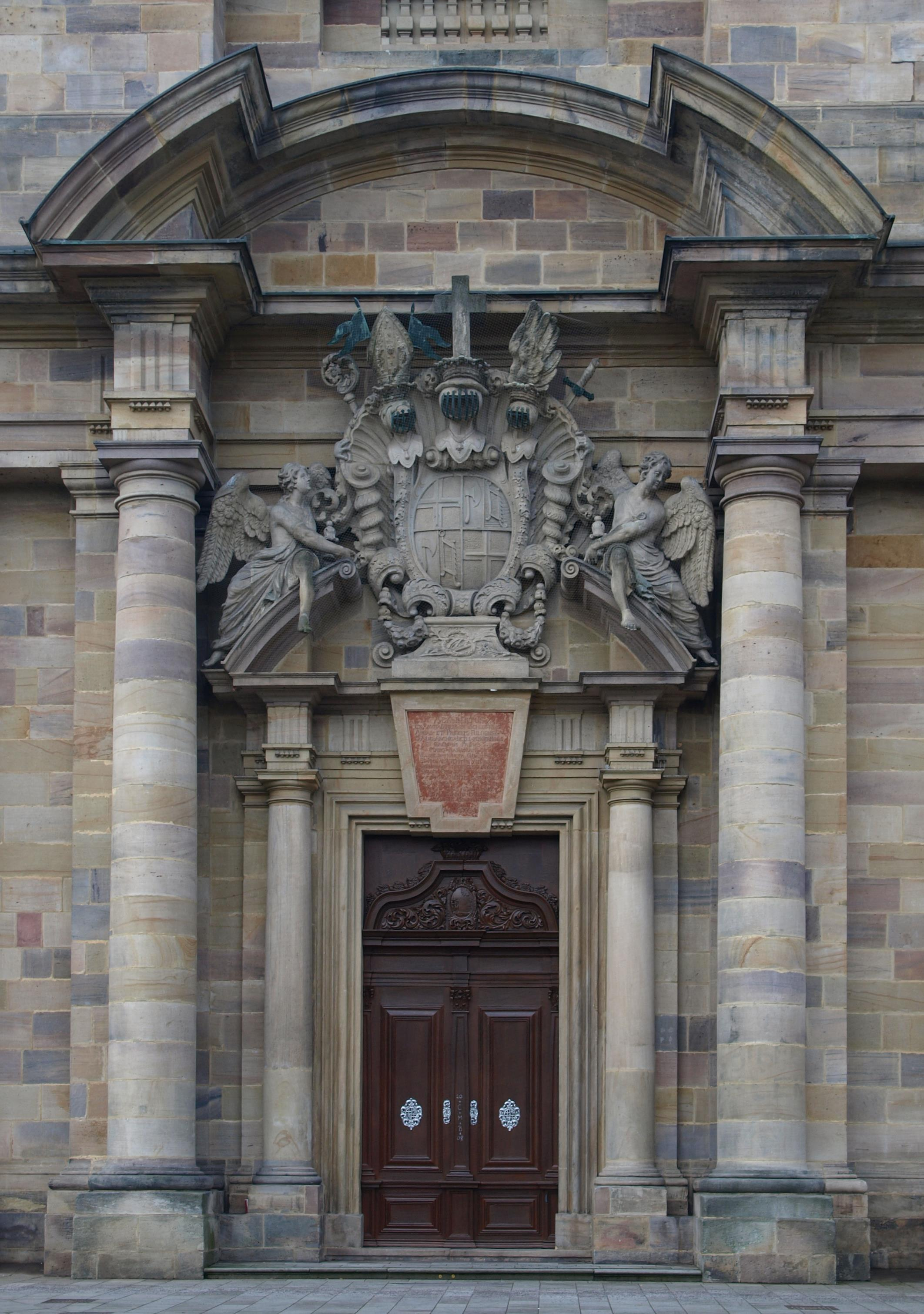
Main portal

Four massive three-quarter columns accompanied by half-pilasters stand to either side of the main portal and support the architrave, the frieze with its triglyphs and the heavy cornices. On the architrave over segments of a round arch sit two large angels, supporting the arms of the Prince-Abbot Adalbert von Schleifras, sculpted by Balthasar Esterbauer, consisting of the arms of Fulda Abbey quartering those of von Schleifras.

The portal door is ornamented with Corinthian pilasters and wrought iron door fittings.

The upper storey of the facade is divided by massive pillars. A large round-topped window is decorated with columns, inflexed arches and urns. The window is surrounded by sandstone sculptures representing the patron saints of Fulda, the twin brothers Simplicius and Faustinus, as knights. Their shields bear their symbol - three lilies - and the cross, the device of the abbey, both of which appear in the arms of the town of Fulda.

The central part of the facade is terminated by a triangular gable filled with urns and a round window. On the point of the gable stands a figure of Christ giving a blessing.

==== Obelisks ====
Next to the two domed chapels stand a pair of sandstone obelisks about 11 metres high, the function of which, besides being decorative, is to make the facade appear broader. On the Abschlussplatte is a pedestal with four rampant lions, and above them the arms of von Schleifras with various inscriptions.

=== Interior ===
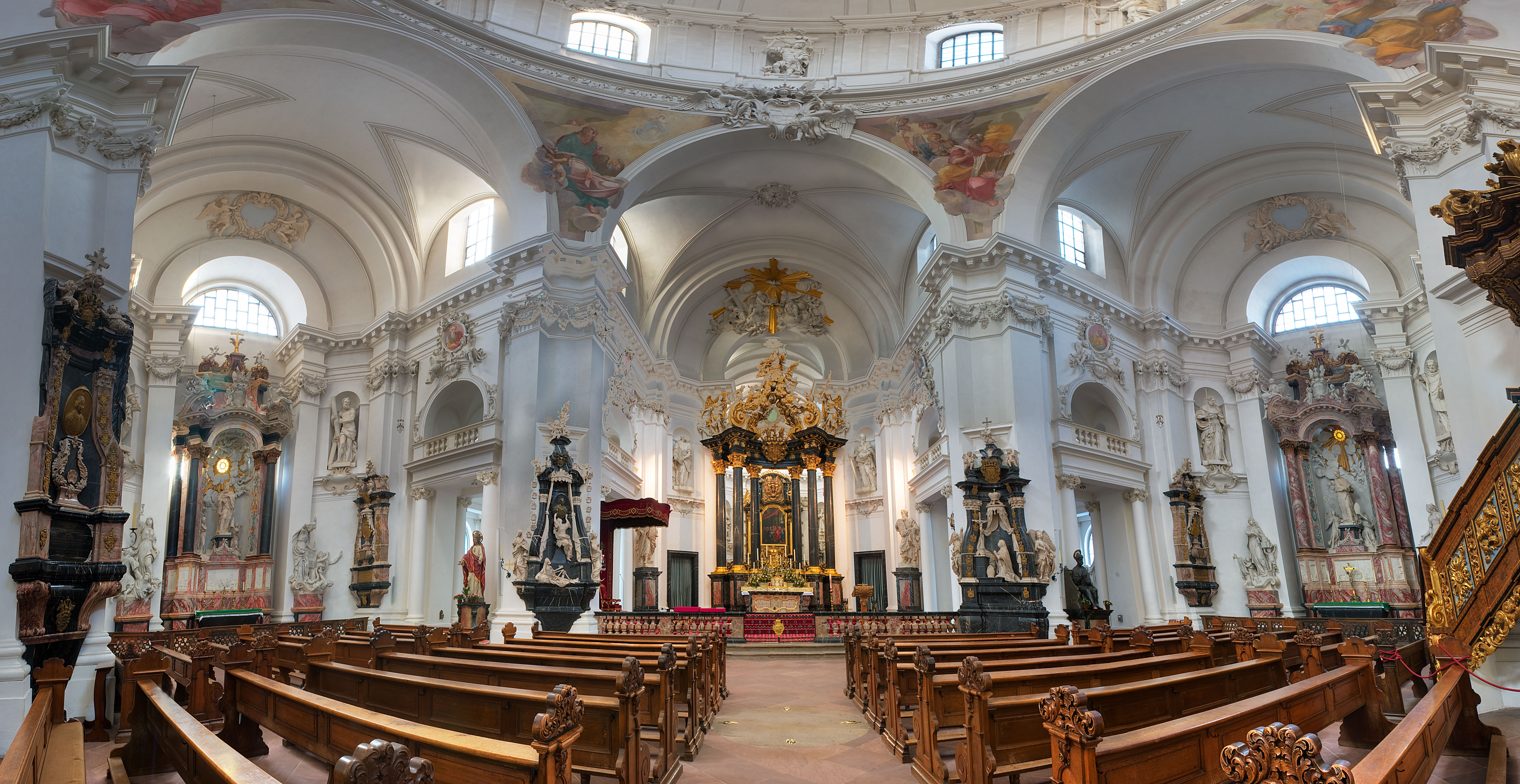
View towards the high altar

The white interior combines elements of St. Peter's Basilica and St. John Lateran in Rome. The magnificent decoration shows the influence of Roman Baroque. The overall effect is dominated by the contrast between the white of the walls and of the stucco on the one hand and the black and gold of the architectonic elements and of the fittings on the other. Giovanni Battista Artari, a stuccoist, decorative artist and sculptor, created the stucco work of the interior as well as the larger than life-size stucco figures of the Apostles, who are represented in accordance with their description by the Apostle Paul in Galatians 2.9 as "pillars" of the church.

==== The Golden Wheel ====
A great curiosity in both the old Ratgar Basilica and the later Baroque church and cathedral was the so-called "Golden Wheel" (German: das Goldene Rad), a medieval musical apparatus, which was made in 1415 during the rule of the Abbot Johann I von Merlau and for over 370 years delighted the faithful with its evocation of the "music of the spheres". It was in the form of a great star, consisting of 14 rays about 2.5 metres long mounted on a round metal plate; from the rays hung 350 bells. It was set and kept in motion by two ropes or cables running round an axle, by which the star could be kept turning and the bells ringing. It was lavishly decorated with glittering golden Gothic floral finials and vesica-shaped decorations.

By the time it was reinstalled in the new Baroque church in 1712 there were only 127 bells remaining.

It was hung in the nave to the east of the dome. In 1781 a cable broke during the Whitsun service and the heavy wheel crashed to the ground causing deaths and injuries. It was left in a barn for two years, and before a decision could be reached about whether it should be re-hung, all the bells had disappeared. The bishop's smith then broke it up and reused the metal.

==== Dome ====
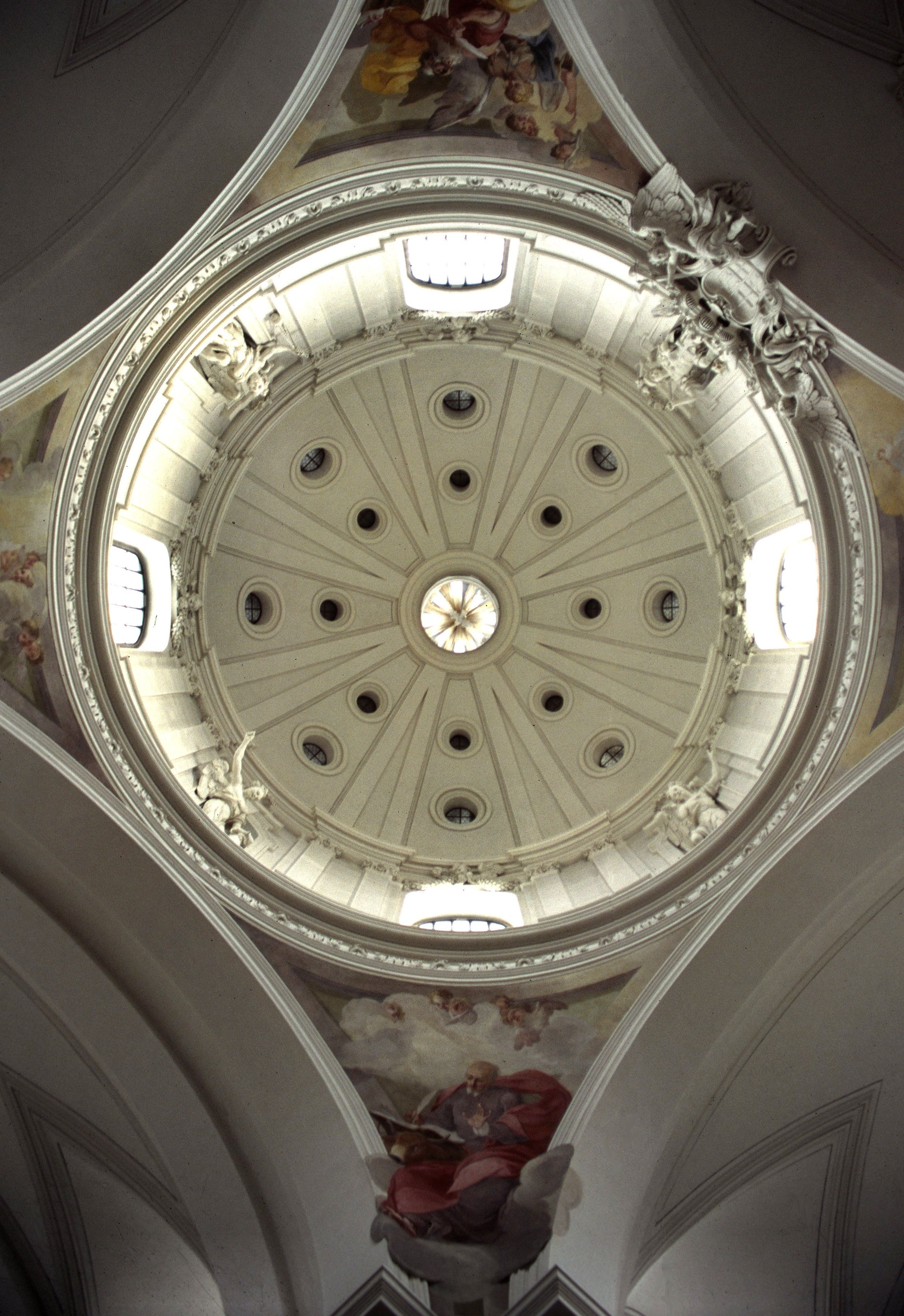
View of the dome

Dientzenhofer was inspired in the design of the dome by that of the Church of Il Gesù in Rome, the mother church of the Jesuit Order, and like that of Il Gesù, the dome of Fulda Cathedral is intended to be the visual focal point of the building. In the spandrels above the pillars of the dome are well-preserved frescoes by Luca Antonio Columba, depicting the four Evangelists. In the niches are stucco figures greater than life-size by Giovanni Battista Artari: directly in front of the high altar stands the Archangel Michael holding scales and a sword, with the devil at his feet; to the left, the Archangel Gabriel holding a lily; to the right the Archangel Raphael holding a censer; and at the back a guardian angel, showing a child the way to heaven. Finally in the dome itself is a stucco figure of the Holy Spirit in the form of a dove in a burst of radiance.

== Fittings and furnishings ==
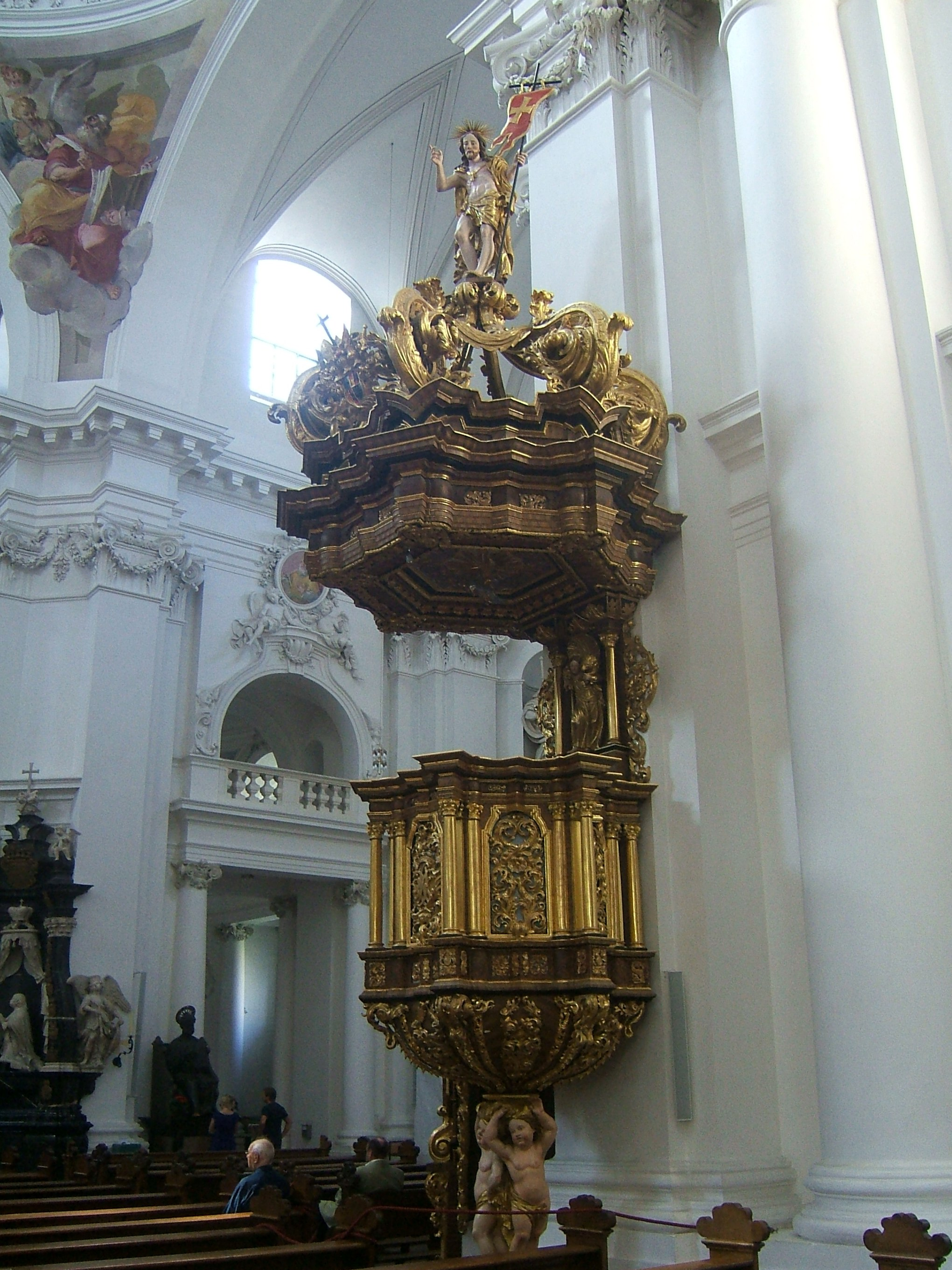
Pulpit

=== Bells ===
The cathedral has ten bells hung in the two towers: bells 1–3 in the north tower, and bells 4–10 in the south tower.

The Salvator is the only bell now surviving of the set cast in 1897 by Carl & Rudolf Edelbrock. In 1908 Carl Edelbrock added an Osanna.

The Osanna which now hangs in the top storey of the north tower is a different bell, cast by Friedrich Wilhelm Schilling. It is supposed to be one of the best bells he ever cast: the story is that it did not need to be tuned after casting. The present Sturmius and Lioba bells were recast from bells of 1897 which were not in tune with the 1908 Osanna. In 1994 the Karlsruher Glocken- und Kunstgießerei cast five bells to replace another five smaller bells from the set of 1897.

=== High altar ===
The sculptor Johann Neudecker and the stuccoist Giovanni Battista Artari worked together to make the high altar, which on 15 August 1712 Prince-Abbot Adalbert von Schleifras dedicated in honour of the Assumption of the Blessed Virgin Mary, as she is received by the Holy Trinity.

=== Organ ===
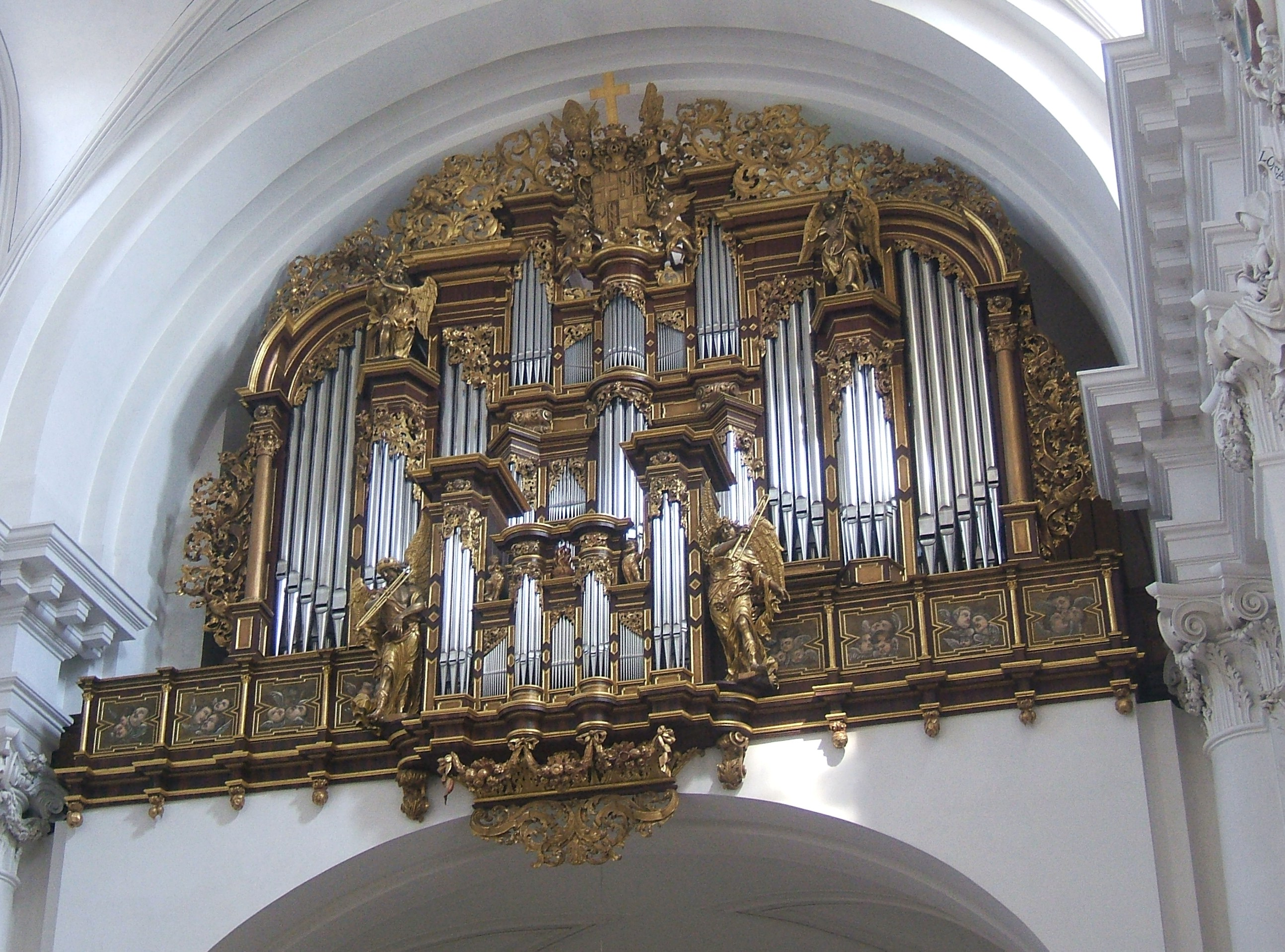
Organ

Between 1708 and 1713 an organ was built in the new church by the Franciscan Adam Öhninger, with 41 registers on three keyboards and pedals. Andreas Balthasar Weber and the artist-woodworker Georg Blank undertook the carvings on the organ case. In a comprehensive restoration of the cathedral between 1992 and 1996 the case was restored and the old colours that were discovered were replaced as close as possible in the original. The Rieger Orgelbau company completed in 1996 the new organ works, using some of the pipes from the old Sauer organ. The present organ comprises 5 divisions on 4 manuals and the pedals with 72 registers.

=== Crypt ===
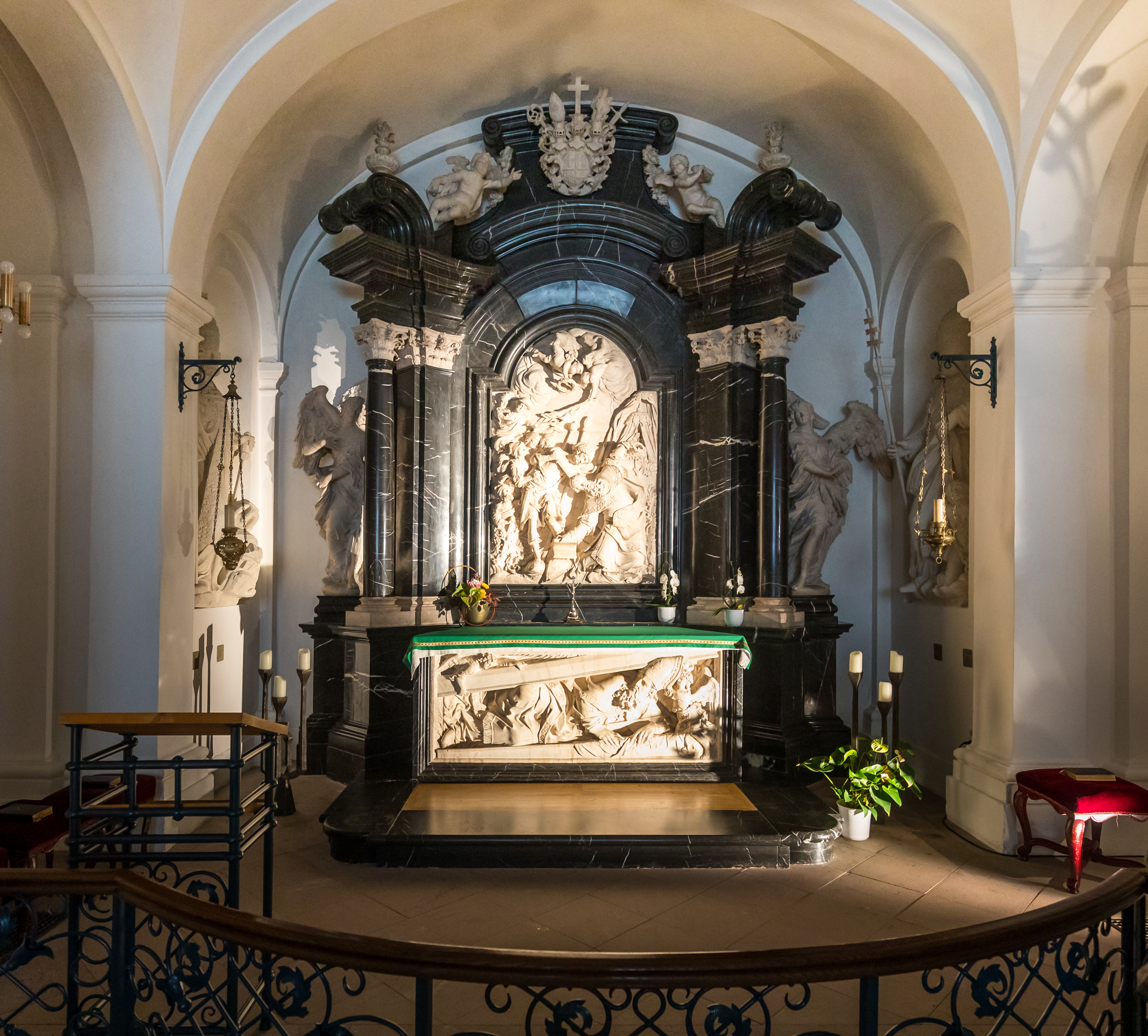
The tomb of Saint Boniface

The Boniface Chapel in the crypt is a survival from the Ratgar Basilica and houses the remains of Saint Boniface, the "Apostle of the Germans", in a sarcophagus, which also has a relief carving and an antependium by Johann Neudecker. During his visit to Fulda in 1980, Pope John Paul II prayed at the tomb of Saint Boniface and in his sermon emphasized Boniface's importance as the beginning of the gospel in Germany.

== Surroundings of the cathedral ==
To the north of the cathedral is the former St. Michael's Priory, since 1831 the bishop's residence, and the Carolingian St. Michael's Church. Directly attached to the cathedral to the west are the Baroque former conventual buildings of the abbey, constructed between 1771 and 1778, now the Theological Department of the University of Fulda. Nearby is the modern chapel of the Catholic seminary, which was built 1966-1968 by the architect Sep Ruf. South of the monastery is the deanery and the dean's garden, where a lapidarium is now located. In part of the deanery buildings is the cathedral museum.

== Cathedral museum ==
The adjoining cathedral museum contains numerous liturgical vestments and vessels, including the "Silver Altar", dating from the 18th century, which includes a reliquary for the head of Saint Boniface and the dagger with which he was murdered, besides others of his relics.

== Cathedral square ==
On the cathedral square directly in front of the main entrance large open-air concerts regularly take place, sometimes featuring international stars (e.g., José Carreras, Chris de Burgh).

== Burials ==
In the cathedral are buried:

- Saint Boniface, d. 754
- Saint Sturm, d. 779
- King Conrad I, d. 918
- Anna, Landgravine of Hesse, d. 1918
- many of the Prince-Abbots and Bishops of Fulda, including Heinrich von Bibra (d. 1788) and Johannes Dyba (d. 2000)

== Images ==
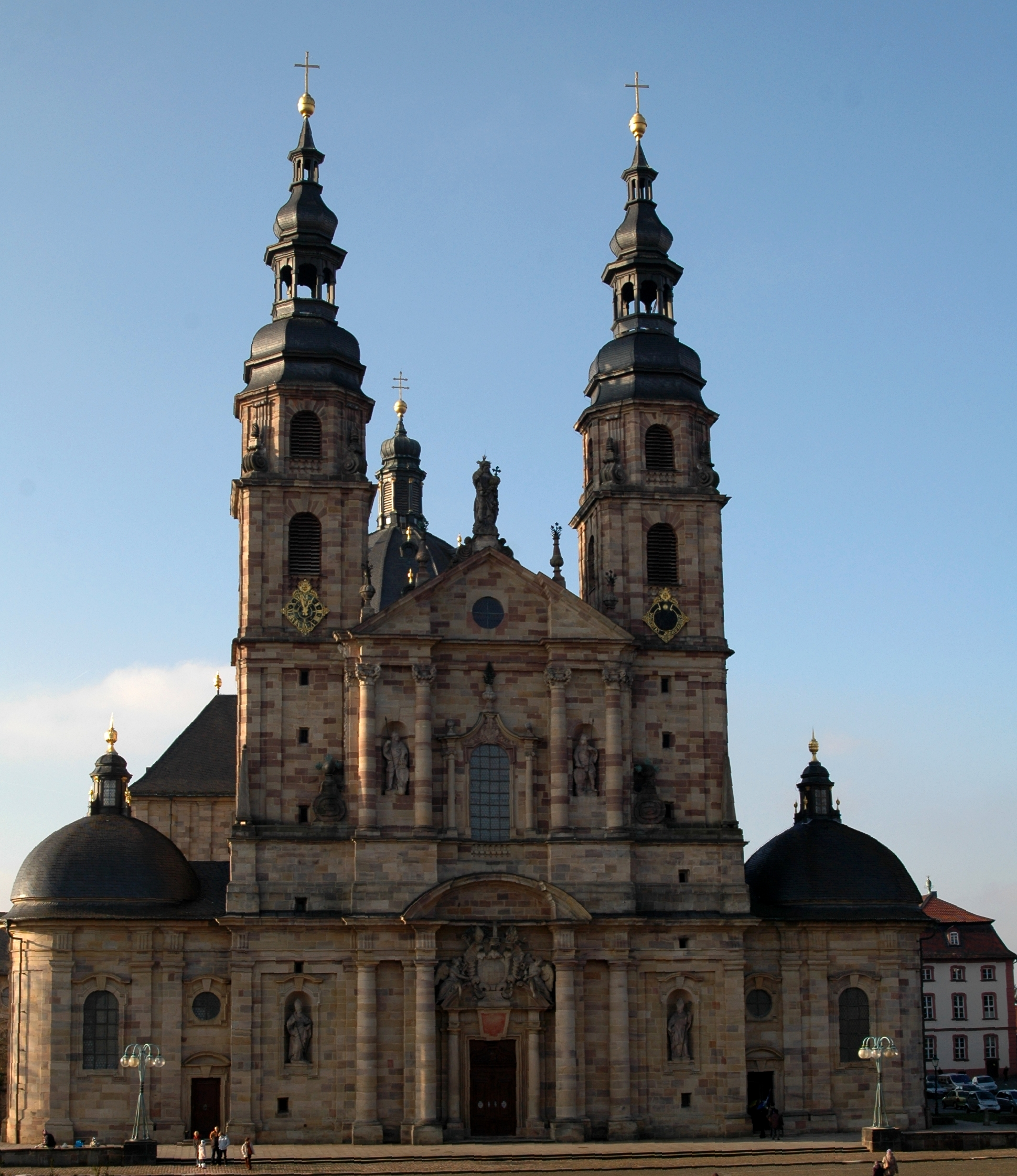
East front and cathedral square

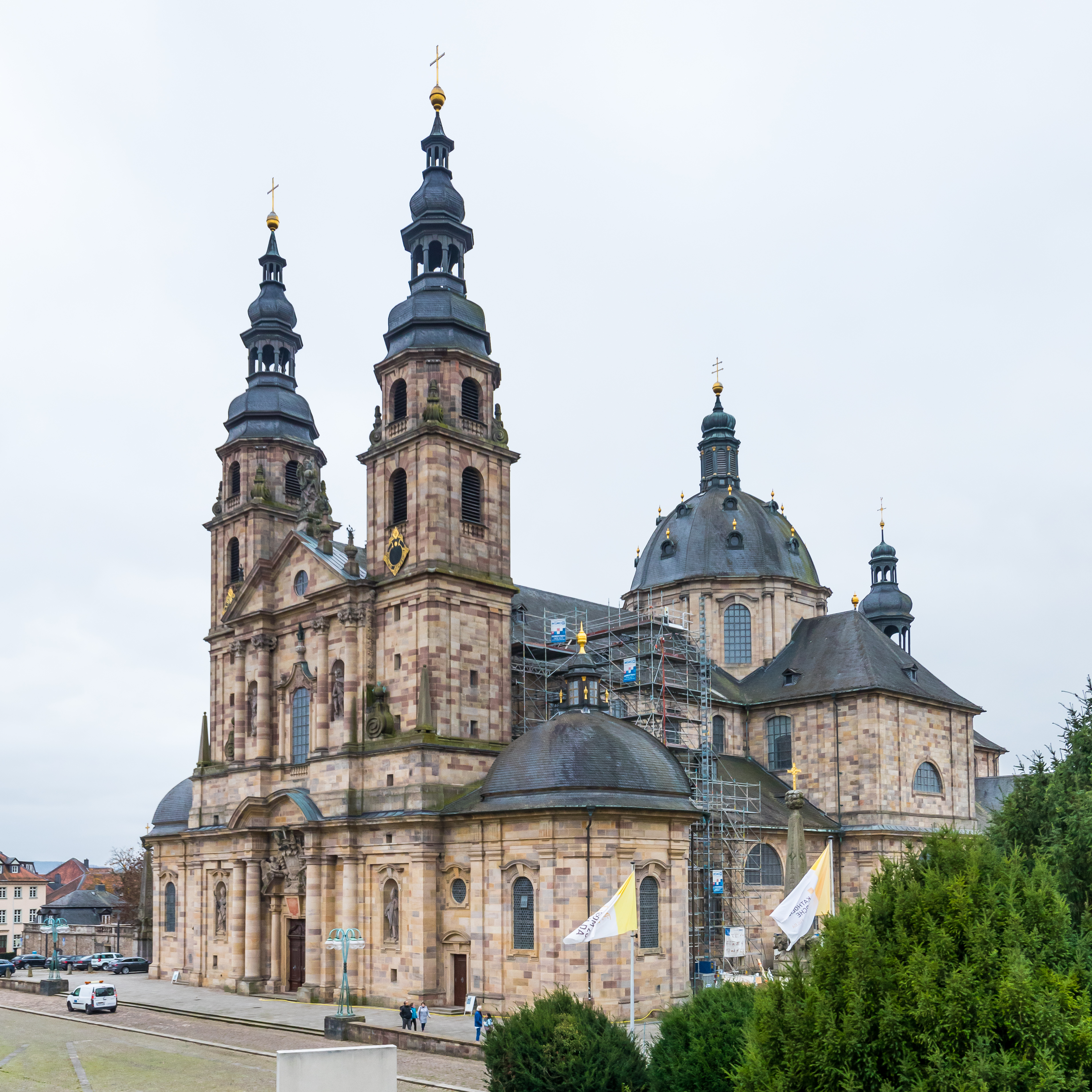
View from the Michaelsberg

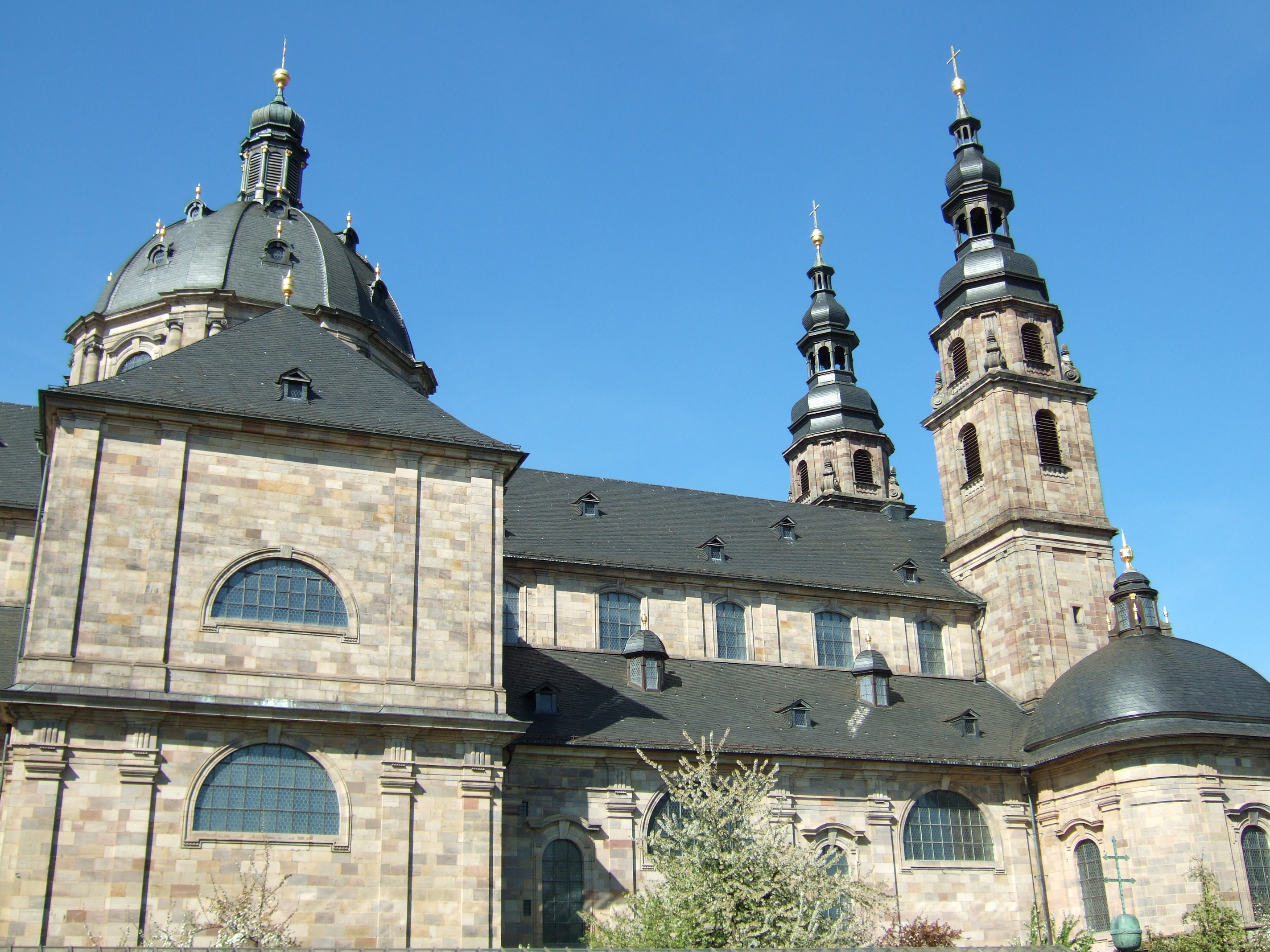
View from the south

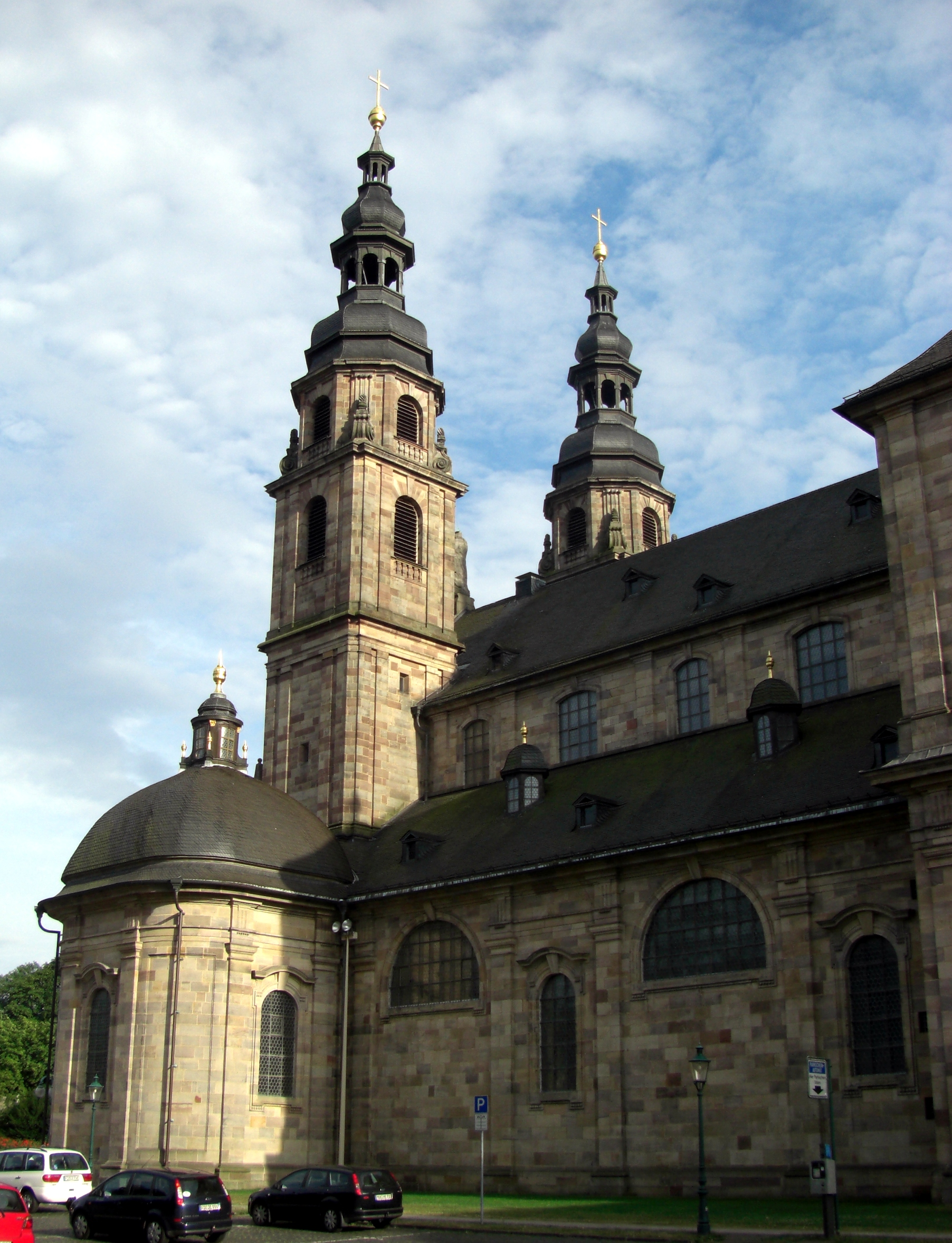
View from the north-west across the Eduard-Schick-Platz
