= Heinz Josef Algermissen =

German bishop

His Excellency Heinz Josef Algermissen
- Bishop of Fulda
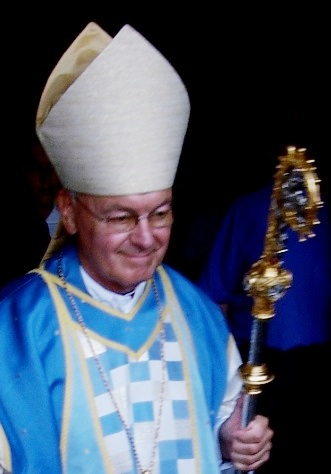
- Church: Roman Catholic
- Diocese: Diocese of Fulda
- Appointed: 20 June 2001
- Installed: 23 September 2001
- Term ended: 5 June 2018
- Predecessor: Johannes Dyba
- Successor: Michael Gerber
- Other post: Auxiliary Bishop of Paderborn

Orders
- Ordination: 19 July 1969 by Lorenz Jaeger
- Consecration: 21 September 1996 by Johannes Joachim Degenhardt

Personal details
- Born: February 15, 1943 (age 83) Hermeskeil, Rhine Province, Prussia, Nazi Germany
- Denomination: Roman Catholic
- Residence: Fulda
- Motto: Thesaurus In Vasis Fictilibus
- Coat of arms

Coat of arms of Bishop Heinz Josef Algermissen

Heinz Josef Algermissen (born 15 February 1943 in Hermeskeil, Rhine Province) was bishop of the Roman Catholic Diocese of Fulda from 2001 until 2018.

== Biography ==
After graduation from gymnasium in 1963, Algermissen studied philosophy and theology in Freiburg and Paderborn, where he was ordained priest on 19 July 1969 by Archbishop Cardinal Lorenz Jaeger. After serving as chaplain in Bielefeld and Mescheden, during which time he also counseled at the high school in Paderborn, he became parson in 1980 in Bielefeld-Schildesche, and dean in 1984. In 1991 he became regional dean for the deanery of Minden-Ravensberg-Lippe, and from 1994 to 1998 he was president of the Council of Bishops for the Archdiocese of Paderborn.

Pope John Paul II appointed Algermissen on 23 July 1996 as titular bishop Labicum and made him auxiliary bishop for Paderborn. His ordination took place on 21 September 1996, under the auspices of Johannes Joachim Degenhardt, Archbishop of Paderborn and later cardinal.

On 20 June 2001 John Paul II appointed him Bishop of Fulda, and on 23 September he was installed in Fulda Cathedral. Since 2002 he is president von Pax Christi, and since 2006 he is vice-president of an ecumenical committee dealing with Judaism for the German Bishops' Conference. His resignation was accepted by Pope Francis on 5 June 2018. He is succeeded by Michael Gerber as bishop of Fulda.

== Books authored ==
- Heinz J Algermissen u.a.: Begegnungen. Mit ehemaligen ZwangsarbeiterInnen. hg. von Pax Christi Regensburg und der Arbeitsgemeinschaft für ehemalige ZwangsarbeiterInnen im Evangelischen Bildungswerk Regensburg e.V.. Edition Buntehunde, Regensburg 2003, ISBN 3-934941-07-9
- Heinz J. Algermissen: Dem Wort auf der Spur. Hirtenbriefe, Predigten, Worte des Bischofs. Parzeller, Fulda 2003, ISBN 3-7900-0356-5
- Heinz J. Algermissen: Morgenstern in finst’rer Nacht. Ein Begleiter für die Advents- und Weihnachtszeit. Herder, Freiburg im Breisgau, Basel, Wien 2005, ISBN 3-451-28747-1

Catholic Church titles
Preceded by Johannes Dyba	Bishop of Fulda; 2001 - 2018	Succeeded by Michael Gerber
