= Georg von Kopp =

German Cardinal (1837-1914)

His Eminence Georg von Kopp
- Bishop of Breslau
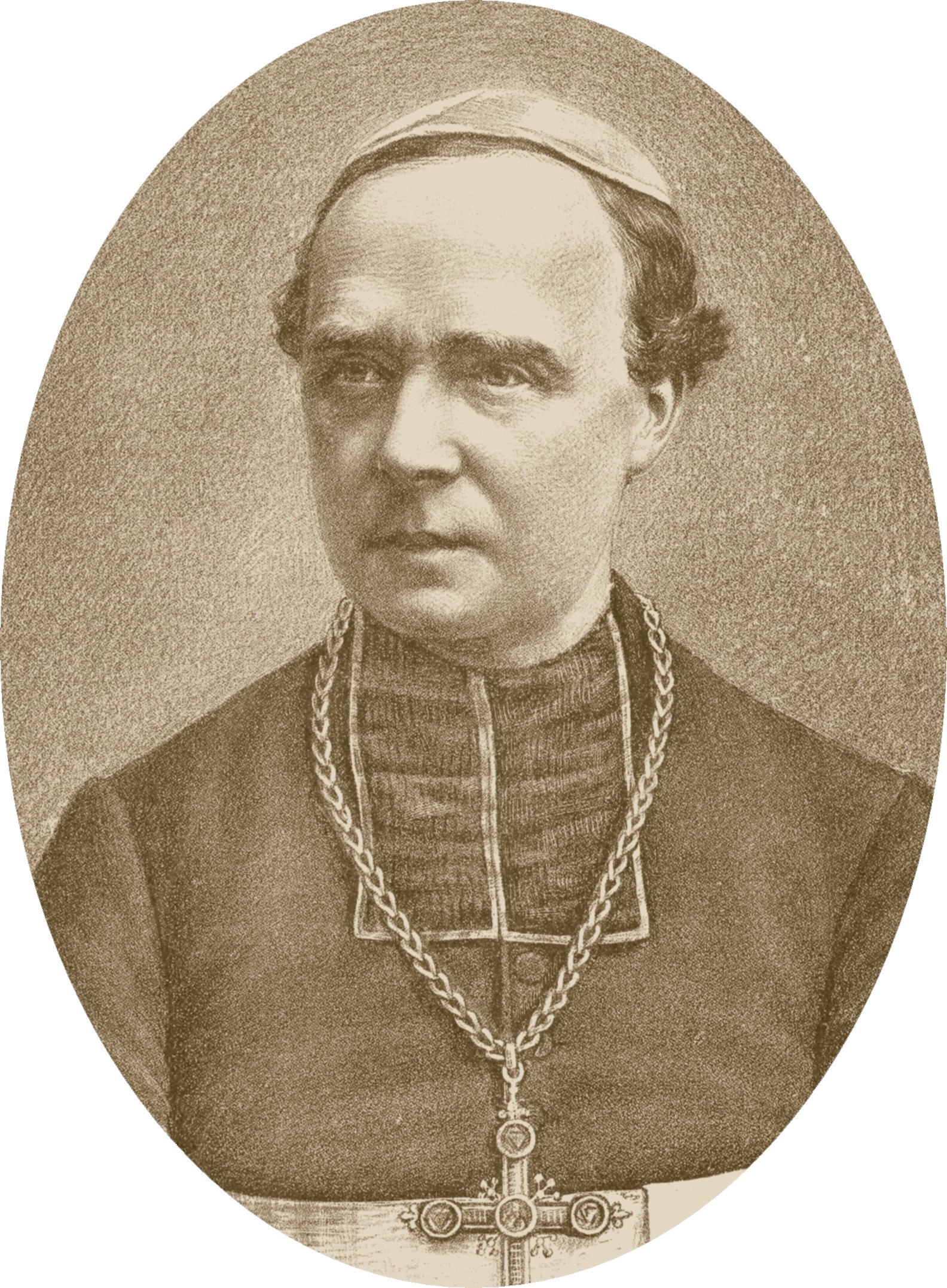
- Diocese: Breslau
- See: Breslau
- Appointed: 9 August 1887
- Term ended: 4 March 1914
- Predecessor: Robert Herzog
- Successor: Adolf Bertram
- Other post: Cardinal-Priest of Sant'Agnese fuori le mura
- Previous post: Bishop of Fulda (1881-1887)

Orders
- Ordination: 28 August 1862
- Consecration: 27 December 1881 by Daniel Wilhelm Sommerwerk
- Created cardinal: 16 January 1893 by Pope Leo XIII
- Rank: Cardinal Priest

Personal details
- Born: 25 July 1837 Duderstadt, Kingdom of Hanover
- Died: 4 March 1914 (aged 76) Opava, Austrian Silesia
- Denomination: Roman Catholic
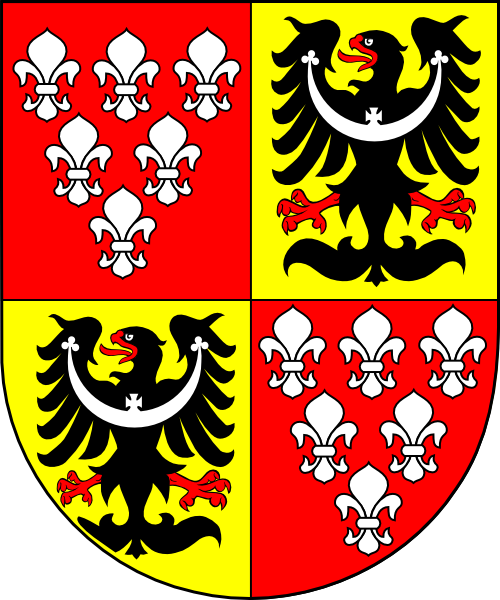
- Coat of arms

Georg von Kopp (25 July 1837 – 4 March 1914) was a German Cardinal of the Roman Catholic Church who served as Bishop of Fulda (1881–1887) and Prince-Bishop of Breslau (1887–1914). He was known for his anti-Polish views and pursued the Germanization of Polish Catholics in his dioceses.

== Biography ==
Kopp was born in Duderstadt in the Kingdom of Hanover. He was the son of a weaver and attended the gymnasium at Hildesheim. In 1856 he became a telegraph operator in the employ of the Hanoverian government.

Kopp studied theology from 1858 to 1861 and entered the priesthood in 1862. He rose rapidly in his profession and in 1872 was made vicar-general at Hildesheim and three years later bishop of Fulda. He worked to bring about a better understanding between the German government and the papal curia. After his election to the House of Lords he obtained a mitigation of the anti-Catholic provisions which characterized the May laws.

In 1887, with the approval of the Prussian government, the Pope appointed him prince-bishop of Breslau (Wrocław), and in 1893 he was made cardinal. As prince bishop he pursued Germanization and censured those priests whom he suspected as resisting these measures, opposed used of Polish in classes and communion, and tried secretly to discourage Polish faithful from making pilgrimages to Kraków. He was made Cardinal by Pope Leo XIII in 1893. He took part in the 1903 conclave which elected Pope Pius X. He was honored to be listed first among the recipients of that pope’s encyclical Singulari Quadam promulgated on 24 September 1912. Kopp died in Opava in Austrian Silesia.

== Notes ==
Catholic Church titles
Preceded by Christoph Florentius Kött	Bishop of Fulda; 1881–1887	Succeeded by Joseph Weyland
Preceded by Robert Herzog	Prince-Bishop of Breslau; 1887–1914	Succeeded by Adolf Bertram
Preceded by Charles-Martial Allemand-Lavigerie	Cardinal Priest of Sant'Agnese fuori le mura 1893–1914	Succeeded by Karoly Hornig
Preceded by Philipp Krementz	Chairman of the Fulda Conference of Catholic Bishops; 1897–1913	Succeeded by Felix von Hartmann
