= Johann Baptist Orbin =

German Roman Catholic clergyman

- Archbishop of Freiburg im Breisgau
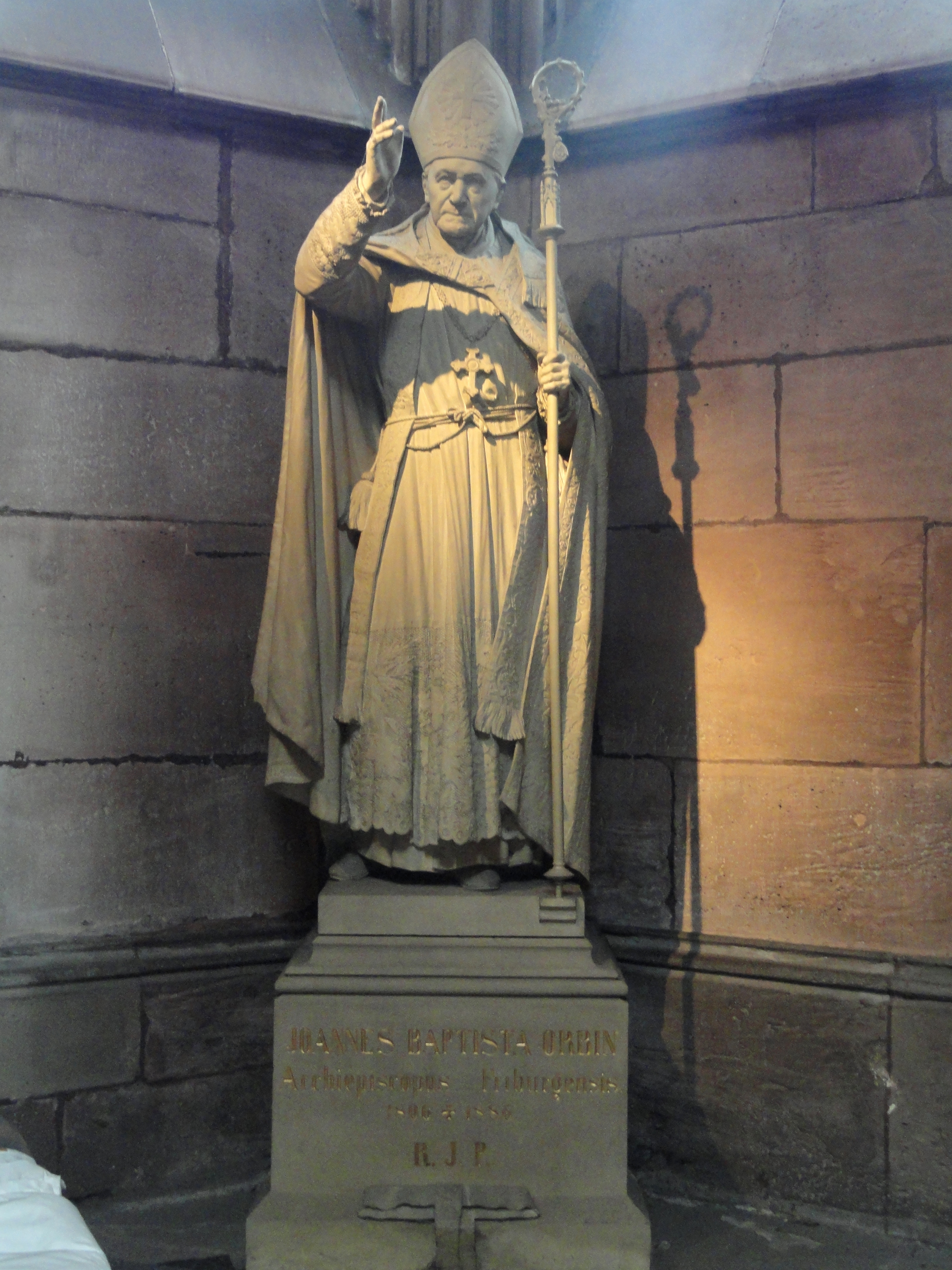
- Sculpture of Orbin
- Church: Catholic Church
- Archdiocese: Archdiocese of Freiburg im Breisgau
- In office: 12 May 1882 – 8 April 1886
- Predecessor: Hermann von Vicari
- Successor: Christian Roos

Orders
- Ordination: 6 August 1830
- Consecration: 12 July 1882 by Karl Josef von Hefele

Personal details
- Born: 22 September 1806 Bruchsal, Grand Duchy of Baden, Rhine Confederation, French Empire
- Died: 8 April 1886 (aged 79) Freiburg im Breisgau, Grand Duchy of Baden, German Empire
- Coat of arms

Johann Baptist Orbin (22 September 1806 in Bruchsal – 8 April 1886 in Freiburg im Breisgau) was a German Roman Catholic clergyman. From 1882 until his death he was Archbishop of Freiburg, a post which had been sede vacante for thirteen years after the death of Hermann von Vicari.

Catholic Church titles
| Preceded by Lothar von Kübel as apostolic administrator | Archbishop of Freiburg; 1882–1886 | Succeeded by Johannes Christian Roos |
