= Diocese of Fulda =

Catholic diocese in Germany

Coordinates: 50°33′15″N 9°40′18.3″E

Diocese of Fulda Dioecesis Fuldensis Bistum Fulda

Catholic
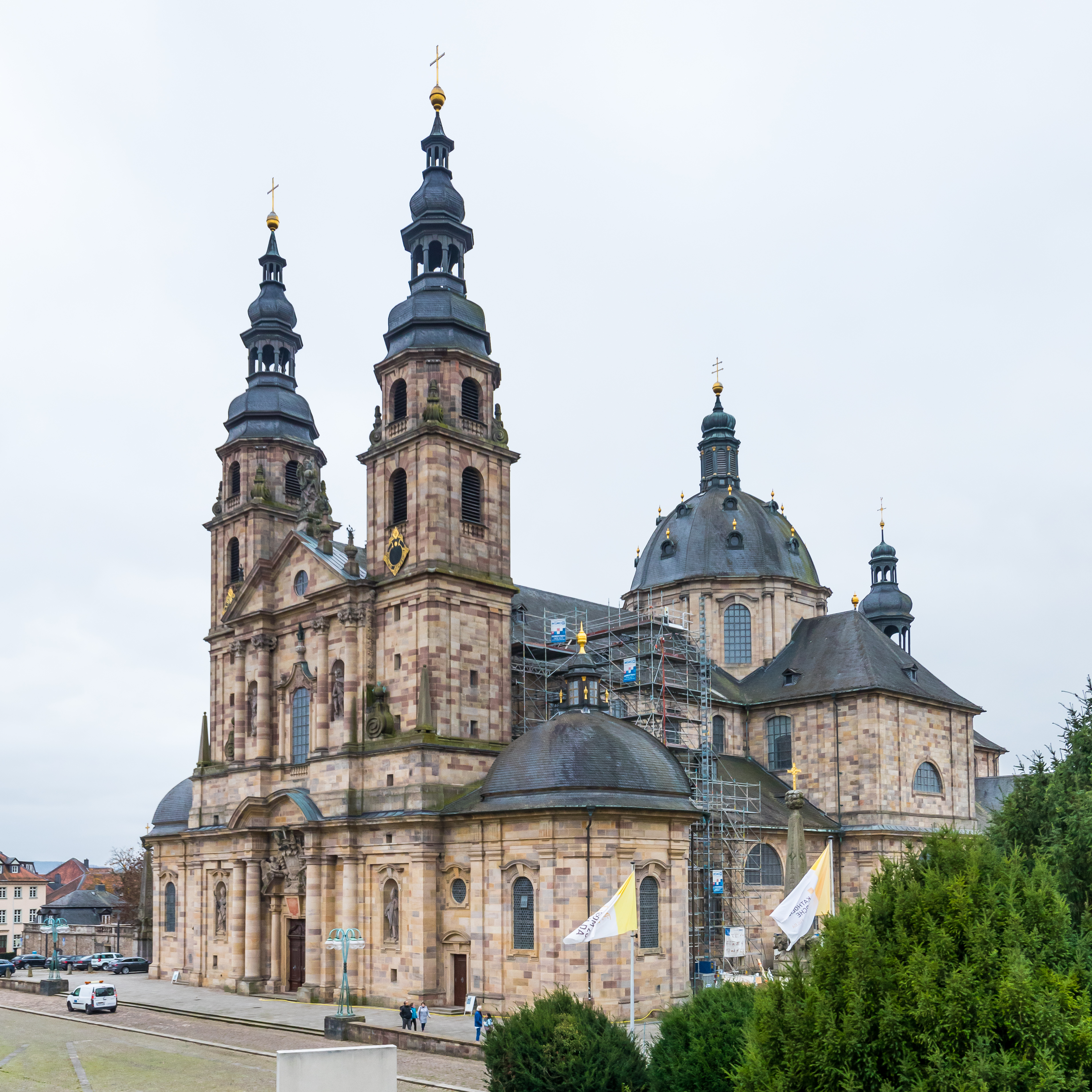
- Fulda Cathedral

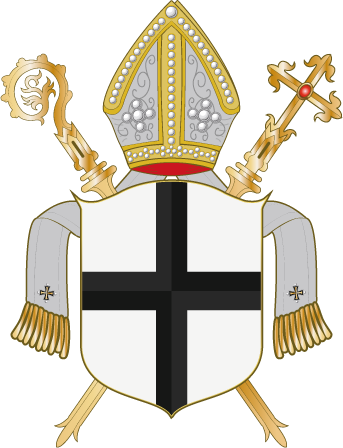
- Coat of arms

Location
- Country: Germany
- Ecclesiastical province: Paderborn
- Metropolitan: Paderborn
- Deaneries: 10
- Subdivisions: 43 pastoral areas

Statistics
- Area: 10,318 km^{2} (3,984 sq mi)
- Population: Total; Catholics: (as of 31 December 2017); 1,720,203; 392,840 (22.8%)
- Parishes: 274

Information
- Denomination: Roman Catholic
- Rite: Latin Rite
- Established: 5 October 1752
- Cathedral: Fulda Cathedral
- Patron saint: Saint Boniface main patron Saint Elisabeth second patron
- Secular priests: 262

Current leadership
- Pope: Leo XIV
- Bishop: Michael Gerber
- Auxiliary Bishops: Karlheinz Diez
- Vicar General: Christof Steinert
- Bishops emeritus: Heinz Josef Algermissen

Map
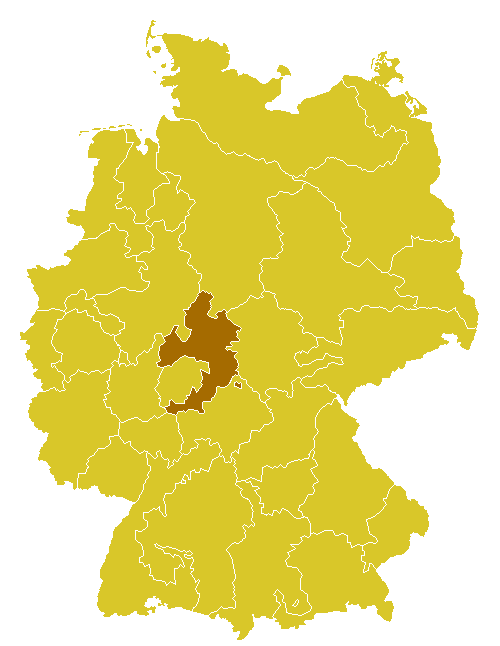
- Current extent of the Diocese

Website
- bistum-fulda.de

The Diocese of Fulda (Latin: Dioecesis Fuldensis) is a Latin Church diocese of the Catholic Church in the north of the German state of Hessen. It is a suffragan diocese of the Archdiocese of Paderborn. The bishop's seat is in Fulda Cathedral.

== History ==
The history of the Diocese of Fulda goes back to the founding of a monastery by Saint Boniface in 744. Boniface named Saint Sturm the abbot of the monastery.

On 4 November 751, Pope Zachary decreed that the monastery would not be under the control of any diocese but rather directly under the Pope. This special relationship with Rome is illustrated still today in the statue of Saint Peter that stands in the Cathedral. Because Boniface's expressly requested that his body be taken to Fulda after his death (rather than to Mainz or Utrecht), the area became a popular destination for pilgrims. Boniface, along with Sturm, were named the patron saints of the monastery and later of the diocese.

Through gifts and donations, the monastery's influence grew ever stronger in the following centuries. Under Rabanus Maurus in the 9th century, the monastery became the scientific center of the Holy Roman Empire.

In 1220, the abbey was elevated to an abbey-principality by Frederick II. In 1571, Jesuits settled in Fulda and made a considerable contribution to the efforts of the Counter-Reformation.

During the reign of Prince-abbot Balthasar von Dernbach (1570-1576 and 1602-1606), the region was the site of extensive witch-hunts with 300 witch-trials carried out in three years. This number made Fulda one of the central areas of the early-modern European witch-hunts.

On 5 October 1752, Pope Benedict XIV raised the abbey to the level of a diocese.

In 1802, with the German mediatisation, the political principality of the diocese was dissolved, but the diocese itself remained. Prince-Bishop Adalbert von Harstall remained the bishop of the diocese until his death in 1814. After his death the diocese was overseen by an administrator rather than a bishop. The borders of the diocese were altered by papal bulls in 1821 and 1827. In 1857, the diocese was expanded to include the grand duchy of Saxe-Weimar. From 1873 to 1881, during the Kulturkampf, when Chancellor Otto von Bismarck attempted to lessen the political power of the church, the bishop's seat sat empty again.

In 1929, the diocese lost some regions in the area of Frankfurt am Main to the diocese of Limburg, receiving the predominant Catholic commissariat in Heiligenstadt and the deanery of Erfurt from the diocese of Paderborn, itself elevated to archdiocese. The Diocese of Fulda then switched as suffragan from the Upper Rhenish Ecclesiastical Province to the new Paderbon-led Middle German Ecclesiastical Province.

During the partition of Germany after World War II, it became much more difficult for the Bishop of Fulda, as well as the Bishop of Würzburg, to conduct the business of his office in the parts of his diocese which lay in the eastern zone. Therefore, 1946 saw the appointment of the provost of the Erfurt Cathedral to the position of vicar general of the eastern sections of both the Fuldean and Würzburger diocese. In 1953, he was made auxiliary bishop of the region. With the reordering of the Catholic Church in East Germany, in 1973, by decree of the Holy See, the East German regions of both diocese were reassigned to the Episcopal Office of Erfurt-Meiningen (German: Bischöfliche Amt Erfurt-Meiningen). The leader of the Episcopal Office was an apostolic administrator and titular bishop.

After an agreement between the Holy See and the German state of Thuringia, regarding the formation of the diocese of Erfurt on 14 June 1994, on 8 July, the Episcopal Office was made a diocese in itself by Pope John Paul II. Only the deanery of Geisa in the Thuringian Rhön Mountains was returned to the diocese of Fulda, by virtue of their very close historical connection.

One peculiarity is the curate of Ostheim, which according to church law as a historical part of Thuringia still belongs to the diocese of Fulda but, since 1945, has been administered by the diocese of Würzburg.

== Patron saints of the diocese ==
- Saint Boniface (main patron)
- Saint Elisabeth of Hungary (secondary patron)
- Saint Bardo
- Saint Leoba
- Saint Rabanus Maurus
- Saint Sturm

== Ordinaries ==
Prince-Bishop, Prince-Abbot Heinrich von Bibra by his court painter, Johann Andreas Herrlein

For a list of medieval abbots see Rulers of Fulda until Secularization

1. Amand von Buseck, O.S.B. (1738–1756)
2. Adalbert von Walderdorf, O.S.B. (1757–1759)
3. Heinrich von Bibra, O.S.B. (1759–1788)
4. Adalbert Freiherr (Wilhelm Adolph Heinrich) von Harstall, O.S.B. (1788–1814)
  - Heinrich Freiherr (Philipp Ernst) von Warnsdorf, O.S.B. (1814–1817), vicar apostolic
5. Johann Adam Rieger (1828–1831)
6. Johann Leonhard Pfaff (1831–1848)
7. Christoph Florentius Kött (1848–1873)
8. Georg von Kopp (1881–1887)
9. Joseph Weyland (1887–1894)
10. Georg Ignatz Komp (1894–1898)
11. Adalbert Endert (1898–1906)
12. Joseph Damian Schmitt (1906–1939)
13. Johann Baptist Dietz (1939–1958)
14. Adolf Bolte (1959–1974)
15. Eduard Schick (1974–1982)
16. Johannes Dyba (1983–2000)
17. Heinz Josef Algermissen (2001–2018)
18. Michael Gerber (from 2019)
