= August 28 (Eastern Orthodox liturgics) =

Day in the Eastern Orthodox liturgical calendar

Eastern Orthodox liturgical calendar
August 27	August 28	August 29
August 28 O.S. ≍ September 10 N.S. August 28 N.S ≍ August 15 O.S.

An Eastern Orthodox cross

August 28 in Eastern Orthodox liturgical calendars is a feast day and a day of commemoration of saints and martyrs. Although some Orthodox churches use the Revised Julian Calendar and others use the traditional Julian calendar, the fixed commemorations for their respective August 28 are broadly the same, no matter which calendar is used. (Note: Despite the dates being the same, the days to which they refer typically differ by 13 days. The notation Old Style or O.S. is sometimes used to indicate a date in the traditional Julian Calendar (the "Old Calendar"). The notation New Style or N.S. indicates a date in the Revised Julian calendar (the "New Calendar").)

== Saints ==
- Righteous Hezekiah, King of Judah (696 B.C.)
- Righteous Anna the Prophetess, daughter of Phanuel (1st century) (see also: February 3)
- Holy 33 Martyrs of Heraclea, by fire.
- Martyrs Irene and Sophia, by the sword. (see also: September 18)
- Martyrs Diomedes and Laurence, shot with arrows after being tied to a tree.
- Hieromartyr Damon. (Note: He is not listed in the Synaxaria. His memory is recorded in the Sinaitic Codex 631, where two Troparia are dedicated to him.)
- Venerable Moses the Black, of Scetis (c. 375) (Note: "Also, St. Moses, an Æthiopian, who gave up a life of robbery and became a renowned anchoret. He converted many robbers, and led them to a monastery.") (Note: Sabine Baring-Gould lists Venerable Moses the Black on February 7.)
- Martyr Queen Shushanik (Susanna) of Georgia (475) (see also: October 17)

== Pre-Schism Western saints ==
- Saint Hermes and Companions, martyrs in Rome under the judge Aurelian (c. 120) (Note: "At Rome, the birthday of St. Hermes, an illustrious man, who, as we read in the Acts of the blessed pope Alexander, was first confined in prison, and afterwards ended his martyrdom by the sword, under the judge Aurelian.")
- Saint Pelagius of Constance, a child-martyr put to death in Pannonia during the persecution of Roman Emperor Numerian (c. 283) (Note: "At Coutances, in France, St. Pelagius, martyr, who received the crown of martyrdom under the emperor Numerian and the judge Evilasius." His relics were transferred to Città Nuova in Istria and part of them (c 915) to Constance in Germany. He is venerated as the patron-saint of Constance.)
- Saint Julian of Auvergne (3rd century) (Note: Born in Vienne in France, he was an officer in the imperial army and a secret Christian. On the outbreak of persecution, probably under Decius, at first he fled but then gave himself up and was martyred near Brionde.) (Note: "At Brioude, in Auvergne, St. Julian, martyr, during the persecution of Diocletian. Being the companion of the blessed tribune Ferreol, and secretly serving Christ under a military garb, he was arrested by the soldiers, and killed in a barbarous manner by having his throat cut.")
- Saints Fortunatus, Gaius and Anthes, martyrs near Salerno in Italy under Diocletian (303) (Note: "At Salerno, the holy martyrs Fortunatus, Caius, and Anthes, beheaded under the emperor Diocletian and the proconsul Leontius." Their relics were enshrined in Salerno in 940 and they were much venerated.)
- Blessed Augustine of Hippo, Bishop of Hippo (430) (Note: "AT Hippo Regius, in Africa, the birthday of St. Augustine, bishop and famous doctor of the Church. Converted and baptized by the blessed bishop Ambrose, he defended the Catholic faith with the greatest zeal against the Manicheans and other heretics, and after having sustained many other labors for the Church of God, he went to his reward in heaven. His relics, owing to the invasion of barbarians, were first brought from his own city into Sardinia, and afterwards taken by Luitprand, king of the Lombards, to Pavia, where they were deposited with due honors.") (see also: June 15)
- Saint Ambrose, Bishop of Saintes (c. 450) (Note: Bishop of Saintes in France for some fourteen years. He is mentioned in the Life of his successor, St Vivian, and is honoured together with him.)
- Saint Vivianus, Bishop of Saintes and Confessor (c. 460) (Note: He protected his people during the invasion of the Visigoths.)
- Saint Facundinus, Bishop of Taino in Umbria (c. 620)
- Saint Adelindis, founder of Buchau Abbey (c. 930)
- Saint Gorman, a monk at Reichenau in Germany who became Bishop of Schleswig in Denmark (965)

== Post-Schism Orthodox saints ==
- Saint Amphilochius of the Kiev Caves, Bishop of Vladimir, Volhynia (1122)
- Saint Theodore (in monasticism Theodosius) of the Kiev Caves, Prince of Ostrog in Volhynia (1483)
- Saint Sabbas, founder and Abbot of Krypetsk Monastery (Pskov) (1495)

=== New martyrs and confessors ===
- New Hieromartyrs of Zilantov Monastery in Kazan (1918):

- Archimandrite Sergius (Zaitsev);
- Hieromanoks Laurence (Nikitin) and Seraphim (Kuzmin);
- Hierodeacon Theodosius (Alexandrov);
- New Monk-martyrs Leontius (Kariagin) and Stephen;
- Novices George (Timofeev), Hilarion (Pravdin), John (Sretensky), and Sergius (Galin).

- New Hieromartyr Chrysostomos (Kalafatis) of Smyrna, Metropolitan of Smyrna (1922) (Note: The Metropolitan was abducted by a mob incited by Nureddin Pasha on September 9, 1922 (27 August - OS). According to eyewitness accounts, he was tied to a barber chair, cruelly tortured, and put to death. He was declared a Ethnomartyr and a Saint of the Orthodox Church by the Holy Synod of the Church of Greece on 4 November 1992. His commemoration was placed on the Sunday before the Feast of the Elevation of the Holy Cross (i.e. September 7–13).)
- New Hieromartyr Nicholas Georgievsky, Priest (1931)
- New Hieromartyr Basil Sokolsky, Priest (1937)

== Other commemorations ==
- Translation of the relics of Saint Rumwold of Buckingham, infant saint (662) (Note: "A great prodigy is related of St. Rumwold, which led to the devotion with which he was honoured after death. No sooner had the infant been bathed in the regenerating waters of baptism than he at once began to speak, and made a distinct profession of the Christian Faith. He died at Sutthun on the 3rd November, and after a few months his relics were conveyed to Brackley, where his festival was kept on the 28th August. Within three years another translation took place to Buckingham, where he was held in honour till the subversion of the Catholic religion." In 2000 a complete Orthodox Christian service to Saint Rumwold was written along with a tone system (Orthodox musical system) with which to sing it which also has more general application. The service is performed on his two feast days which are November 3 (main feast) and August 28 (translation of relics). In 2005 the former church of Saint Rumwold in Lincoln which is now a college erected a plaque to celebrate the connection.)
- Uncovering of the relics (1659) of St. Job of Pochaev, Abbot and Wonderworker of Pochaev (1651)
- Synaxis of the Saints of the Kiev Caves Lavra, whose relics repose in the Far Caves of St. Theodosius.
- Repose of Elder Philaret of Novo-Spassky Monastery (1842)
- Repose of Archbishop Dmitri Royster of Dallas (2011)

== Icon gallery ==
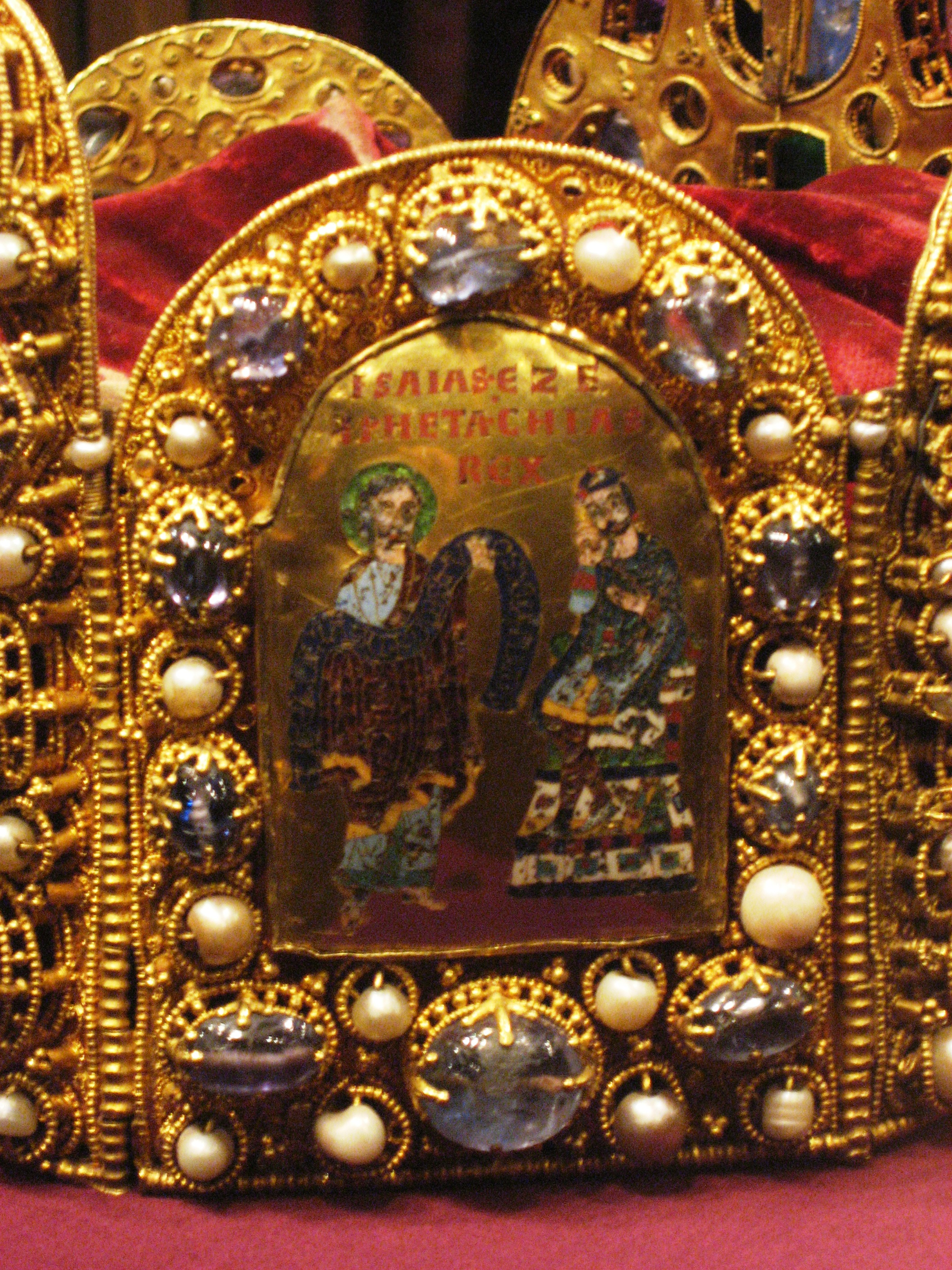
Hezekiah with the prophet Isaiah.

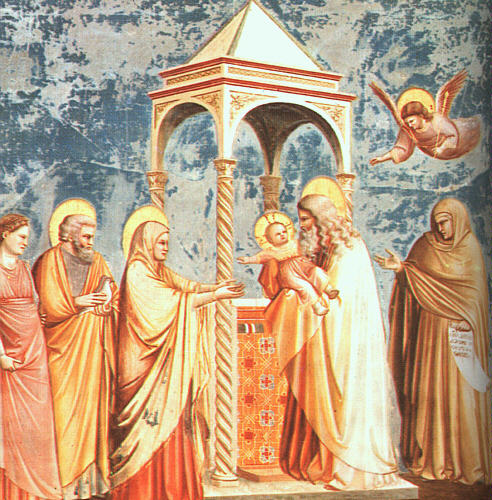
Anna at the presentation of Jesus (right).

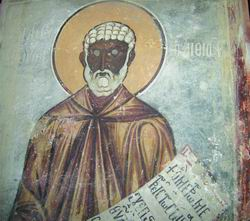
Venerable Moses the Black, of Scetis.

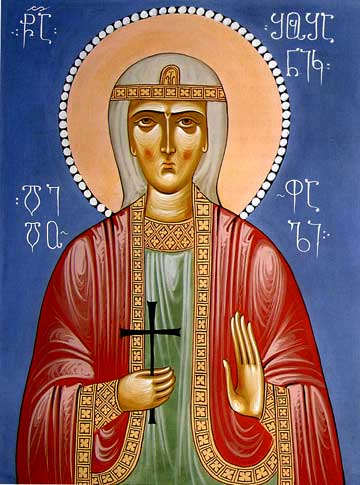
Martyr Queen Shushanik (Susanna) of Georgia.

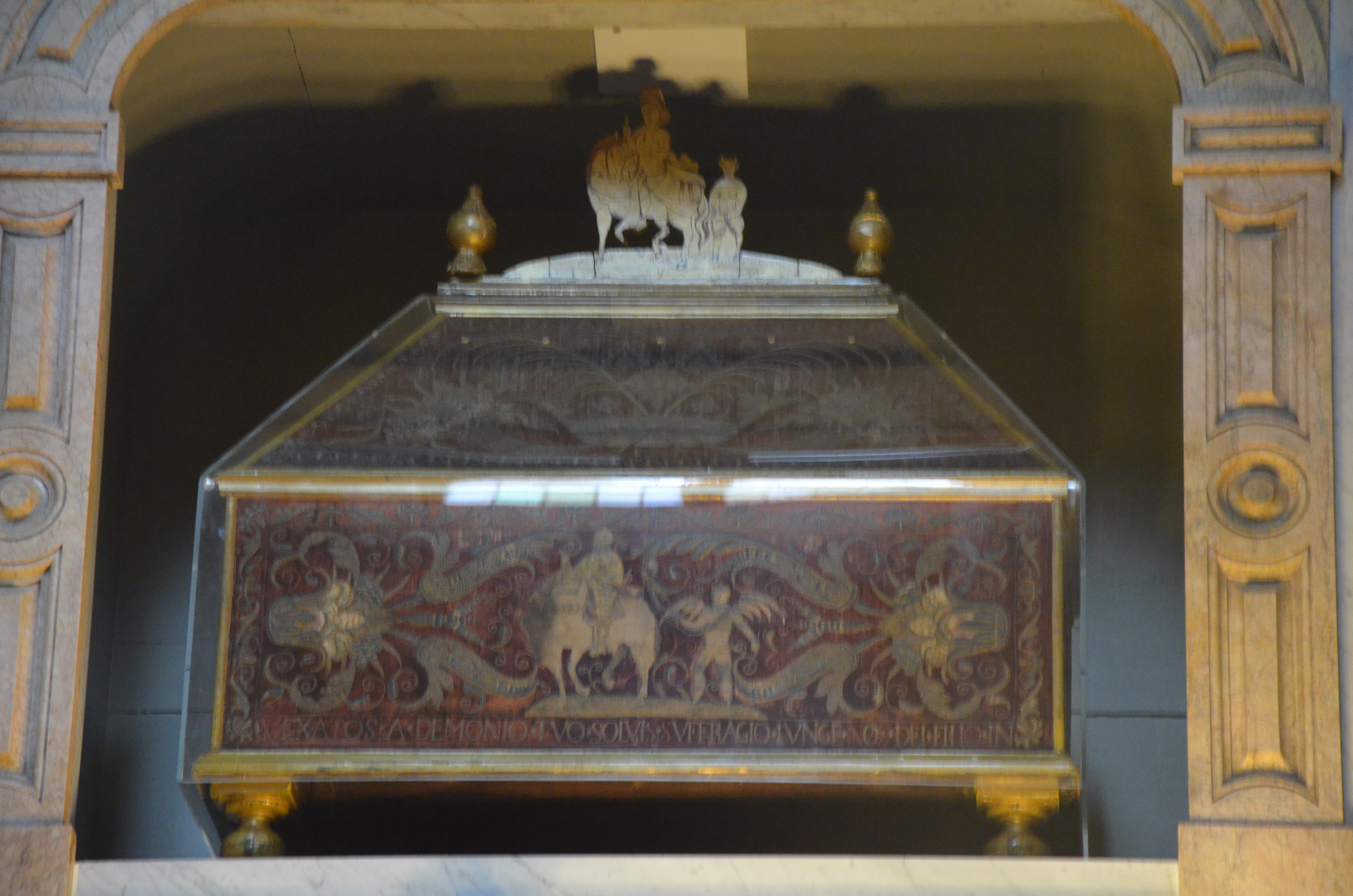
The reliauary of St. Hermes.

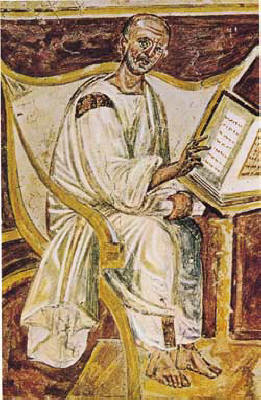
Blessed Augustine of Hippo.

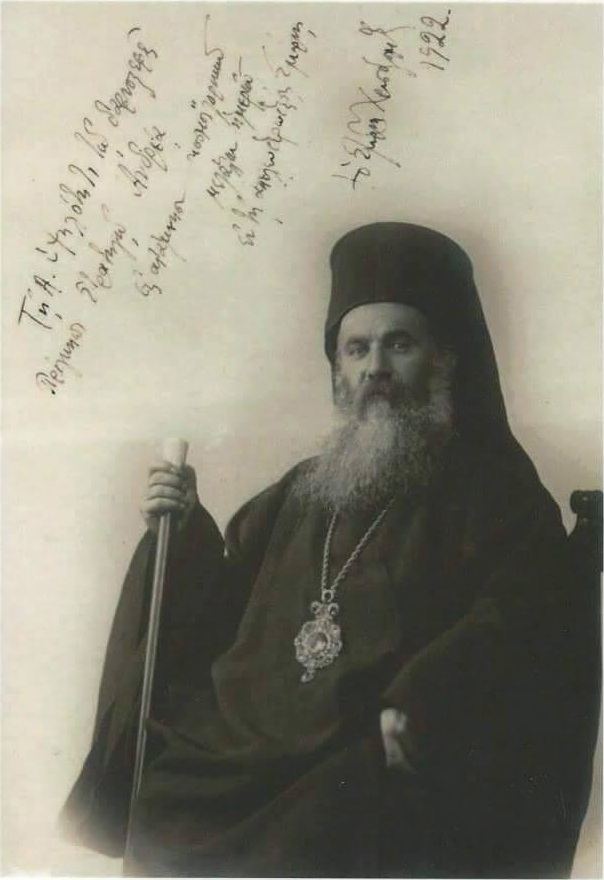
New Hieromartyr Chrysostomos (Kalafatis) of Smyrna.

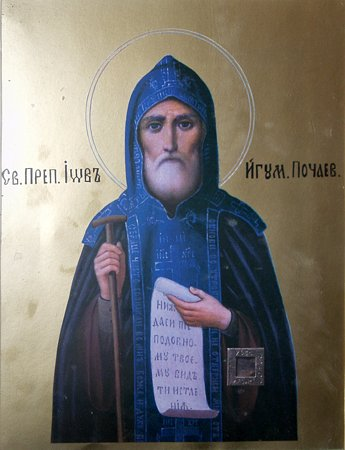
St. Job of Pochaev.

== Sources ==
- August 28 / September 10. Orthodox Calendar (PRAVOSLAVIE.RU).
- September 10 / August 28. Holy Trinity Russian Orthodox Church (A parish of the Patriarchate of Moscow).
- August 28. OCA - The Lives of the Saints.
- The Autonomous Orthodox Metropolia of Western Europe and the Americas (ROCOR). St. Hilarion Calendar of Saints for the year of our Lord 2004. St. Hilarion Press (Austin, TX). p. 64.
- The Twenty-Eighth Day of the Month of August. Orthodoxy in China.
- August 28. Latin Saints of the Orthodox Patriarchate of Rome.
- The Roman Martyrology. Transl. by the Archbishop of Baltimore. Last Edition, According to the Copy Printed at Rome in 1914. Revised Edition, with the Imprimatur of His Eminence Cardinal Gibbons. Baltimore: John Murphy Company, 1916. pp. 260–261.
- Rev. Richard Stanton. A Menology of England and Wales, or, Brief Memorials of the Ancient British and English Saints Arranged According to the Calendar, Together with the Martyrs of the 16th and 17th Centuries. London: Burns & Oates, 1892. pp. 418–424.

Greek Sources

- Great Synaxaristes: (in Greek) 28 ΑΥΓΟΥΣΤΟΥ. ΜΕΓΑΣ ΣΥΝΑΞΑΡΙΣΤΗΣ.
- (in Greek) Συναξαριστής. 28 Αυγούστου. ECCLESIA.GR. (H ΕΚΚΛΗΣΙΑ ΤΗΣ ΕΛΛΑΔΟΣ).

Russian Sources

- (in Russian) 10 сентября (28 августа). Православная Энциклопедия под редакцией Патриарха Московского и всея Руси Кирилла (электронная версия). (Orthodox Encyclopedia - Pravenc.ru).
