= Candlemas =

Christian holiday

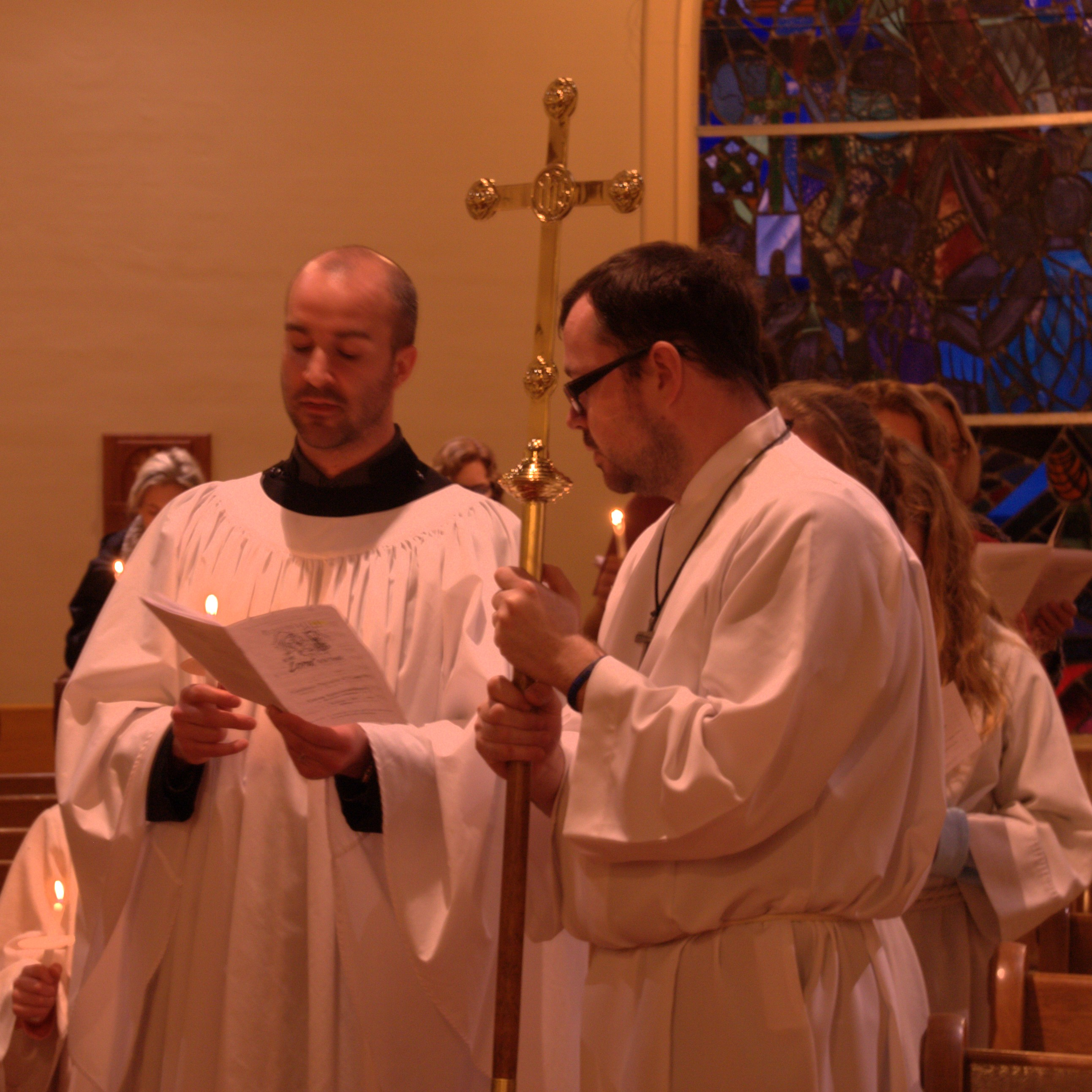
- Blessing of candles on Candlemas at an Episcopal church
- Also called: Candlemass; Candlemas Day; Feast of the Presentation of Jesus Christ; Feast of the Purification of the Blessed Virgin Mary
- Observed by: Christians
- Significance: Commemoration of the presentation of Jesus at the Temple
- Observances: Having candles blessed for the year during a service of worship; removal of Christmas decorations in some localities
- Date: 2 February
- Next time: 2 February 2027
- Frequency: Annual
- Related to: Christmastide; Epiphanytide; Groundhog Day

Candlemas, also known as the Feast of the Presentation of Jesus Christ, the Feast of the Purification of the Blessed Virgin Mary, or the Feast of the Holy Encounter, is a Christian feast day commemorating the presentation of Jesus at the Temple by Joseph and Mary. It is based upon the account of the presentation of Jesus in Luke 2:22–40.

According to the Old Testament rules in Leviticus 12, a woman was to be purified by presenting a lamb as a burnt offering, and either a young pigeon or dove as sin offering, 33 days after a boy's circumcision. The feast falls on 2 February, which is traditionally the 40th day of and the conclusion of the Christmas–Epiphany season.

While it is customary for Christians in some countries to remove their Christmas decorations on Twelfth Night (Epiphany Eve), those in other Christian countries historically remove them after Candlemas. On Candlemas, many Christians (especially Catholics, Eastern Orthodox, Evangelical-Lutherans, and Anglicans) also take their candles to their local church, where they are blessed and then used for the rest of the year; for Christians, these blessed candles serve as a symbol of Jesus Christ, whom they refer to as the "Light of the World".

== History ==
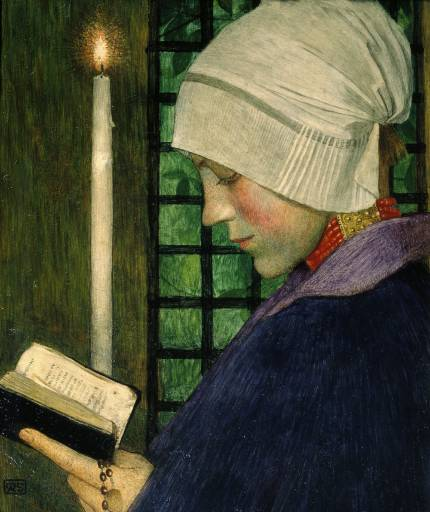
Candlemas Day by Marianne Stokes, 1901

The Feast of the Presentation or Purification is one of the oldest feasts of the church. The pilgrim Egeria recorded how it was celebrated in Jerusalem in the 380s:

But certainly the Feast of the Purification is celebrated here with the greatest honour. On this day there is a procession to the Anastasis; all go in procession, and all things are done in order with great joy, just as at Easter. All the priests preach, and also the bishop, always treating of that passage of the Gospel where, on the fortieth day, Joseph and Mary brought the Lord into the Temple, and Simeon and Anna the prophetess, the daughter of Famuhel, saw Him, and of the words which they said when they saw the Lord, and of the offerings which the parents presented. And when all things have been celebrated in order as is customary, the sacrament is administered, and so the people are dismissed.

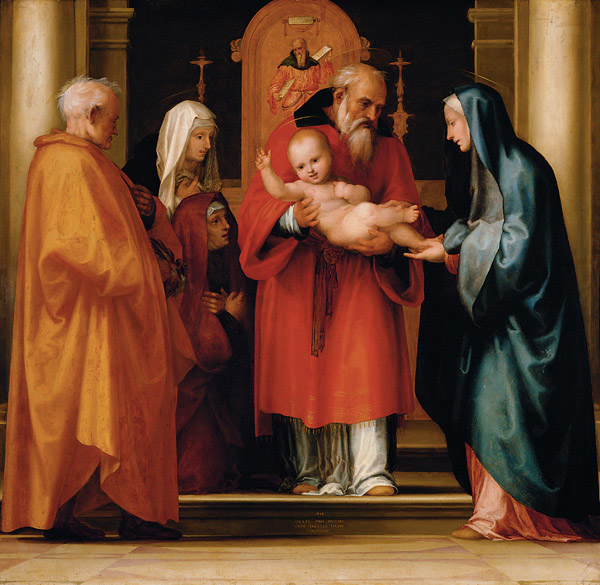
The presentation of the Lord in the temple, by Fra Bartolomeo, 1516

Christmas was, in the West, celebrated on 25 December from at least AD 354 when it was fixed by Pope Liberius. Forty days from 25 December (inclusive) is 2 February. In the Eastern parts of the Roman Empire, emperor Justinian established the celebration of the Hypapante.

Pope Gelasius I (492–496) contributed to the spread of the celebration but did not invent it. It appears that it became important around the time of the Plague of Justinian in 541 before slowly spreading west. The ancient Romans celebrated the Lupercalia in mid-February, in honor of Lupercus, the god of fertility and shepherds. The celebration of Feralia occurred around the same time.

The Lupercalia has frequently been linked to the presentation of Jesus at the temple, particularly by Cardinal Caesar Baronius in the 16th century especially because of the theme of purification that the two festivals share. However, this is probably inaccurate since Lupercalia was not celebrated in Jerusalem, and it was only there that one finds some celebrations of the presentation of Jesus around this date. Pope Gelasius I had much earlier written a letter to senator Andromachus, who wanted to reestablish the Lupercalia for purification. But while the pope opposed the celebration of Lupercalia in the letter, there is no historical indication that he ever intended to substitute it for a Christian feast. Also, the dates do not fit because at the time of Gelasius I the Christian feast was only celebrated in Jerusalem, and it was on 14 February only because Jerusalem placed the Nativity of Jesus (Christmas) on 6 January. Jerusalem's Presentation of Jesus at the Temple on 14 February became the Purification of the Blessed Virgin Mary on 2 February as it was introduced to Rome and other places in the mid-7th century and onwards, after Gelasius I's time.

Moreover, when Gelasius addressed Andromachus, he did not try to use his authority but contented himself to argue, for example, that the Lupercalia would no longer have the effect it once had and was incompatible with Christian ideals. This could be interpreted as evidence that he had limited influence on the Roman aristocracy.

Centuries later, around 1392 or 1400, an image of the Virgin Mary that represented this invocation was found on the seashore by two Guanche shepherds from the island of Tenerife (Canary Islands). After the appearance of the Virgin and its iconographic identification with this biblical event, the festival began to be celebrated with a Marian character in 1497, when the conqueror Alonso Fernández de Lugo celebrated the first Candlemas festival dedicated especially to the Virgin Mary, coinciding with the Feast of Purification on 2 February.

Before the conquest of Tenerife, the Guanche aborigines celebrated a festivity around the image of the Virgin during the Beñesmen festival in the month of August. This was the harvest party, which marked the beginning of the year. Currently, the feast of the Virgin of Candelaria in the Canary Islands is celebrated in addition to 2 February also on 15 August, the day of the Assumption of the Virgin Mary in the Catholic calendar. For some historians, the celebrations celebrated in honor of the Virgin during August are a syncretized reminiscence of the ancient feasts of the Beñesmen.

The Roman church's custom of blessing candles by the clergy found its way to Germany. The German conclusion that if the sun appeared on Candlemas, a hedgehog would cast a shadow, making a "second winter", was the origin of the modern American festival of Groundhog Day, as many of Pennsylvania's early settlers were German.

In Roman Catholicism, in 1997, on the Candlemas day, Pope John Paul II instituted the World Day of Prayer for Consecrated Life.

== Customs ==
=== Europe ===
==== France and Belgium ====
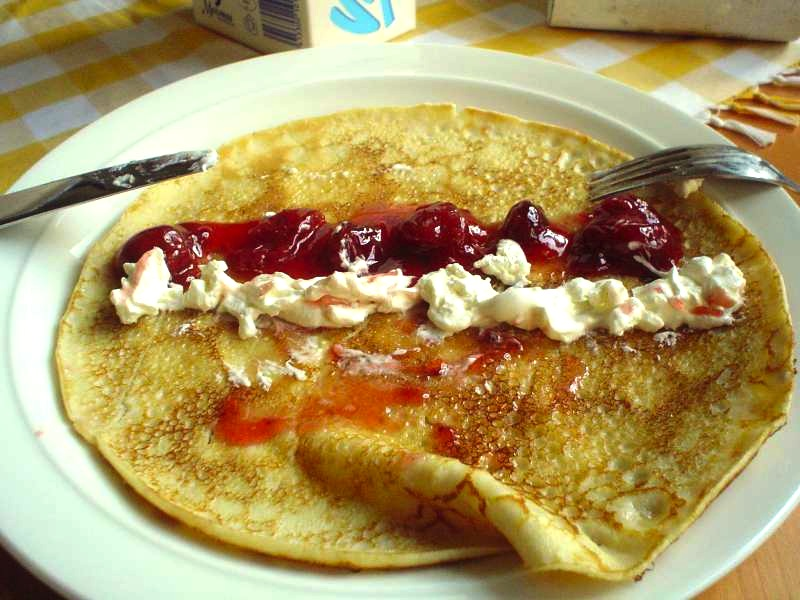
Crêpes are a traditional food on La Chandeleur.

Catholic churches in France, Belgium, and Swiss Romandy celebrate Candlemas (French: La Chandeleur, Dutch: Maria-Lichtmis) on 2 February. Tradition says that manger scenes should not be put away until Candlemas, which is the last feast of the Christmas cycle.

Candlemas in those countries is also considered the day of crêpes. Tradition attributes this custom to Pope Gelasius I, who had pancakes distributed to pilgrims arriving in Rome. Their round shape and golden color, reminiscent of the solar disc, refer to the return of spring after the dark and cold of winter. Even today, a specific symbolism can be associated with preparing the crêpes. A tradition is to flip the crepes in the air with the right hand while holding a gold coin (such as a Louis d'or) or some other coin in the left hand to have prosperity throughout the year. One has to ensure that the pancake lands properly back in the pan.

In Belgium, it is customary to eat pancakes. All the candles in the house should be lit. It is believed that a clear sky on Candlemas foretells a beneficial year for beekeepers.

==== Germany ====
Candlemas used to be an important date (Lostag) in the year. It was associated with payment deadlines, fixed employment relationships, and the beginning of the "farmer's year". In addition, many customs, weather proverbs, other sayings, and rhymes are related to this feast.

The "farmer's year" began on Candlemas, and from then on, fieldwork or the preparations for it can be resumed depending on the circumstances. On Candlemas, the farmer should have had half of the winter food stock for his cattle. Depending on the proverb that one can eat by daylight on Candlemas, the time in which people worked with artificial light sources came to an end, as did when the women sat in the spinning room.

On this day, the "servant's year" also ended. The servants were paid the remainder of their annual wages and could or had to look for a new job or extend their employment with the previous employer for another year, usually with a handshake. The custom of giving the servants a pair of shoes at Candlemas as a reward for further work or looking for a job was also widespread.

==== Hungary ====
In Hungary, a rich array of traditions surround the holiday. The feast is called Gyertyaszentelő Boldogasszony day. Nowadays, children often dress up as bears, light candles and eat honey, but the bears' foretelling is still a well-known event.

Folklore has it that on this day, bears come out of their dens and if they see their shadows (because it's sunny), they get scared of it and go back to sleep, which is thought to mean that it will be cold again. On the other hand, if there is no shadow, they stay outside, knowing that this is the last attempt of winter and that the cold weather will soon ease. This is similar to the American Groundhog Day traditions.

In the Szeged area, it was believed that if the candle did not go out at the time of consecration, there would be a good honey harvest.

Candles have been placed on doorknobs as good luck charms. Also in Göcsej, a piece of a burning candle was placed on the navel of a patient with a bloated stomach and covered with a glass cup, because according to folklore, its extinguishing flame sucked out the disease.

The women of the village of Hercegszántó used to roll red, white and black yarn together with the candle. After the consecration of the candle, necklaces were made from the yarn and worn by the children until the first spring day. In the once Hungarian commune of Vinga, such necklaces were worn until Holy Saturday when they were burnt.

==== Luxembourg ====
A descendant of an ancient torchlight procession, the current tradition of Liichtmëssdag in Luxembourg is a holiday centered around children. In small groups, they roam the streets in the afternoon or evening of 2 February, holding a lighted lantern or homemade wand, singing traditional songs at each house or store, especially "Léiwer Härgottsblieschen". In exchange for the music, they hope to receive a reward in the form of sweets or loose change (formerly bacon, peas, or biscuits).

==== Spain: Canary Islands ====
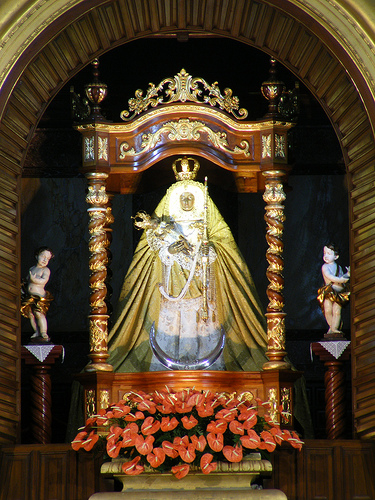
Virgin of Candelaria (patron of the Canary Islands). The Virgin of Candles is depicted in the manner of a Black Madonna.

La Virgen de la Candelaria or Nuestra Señora de la Candelaria (Our Lady of Light or Our Lady of Candles), popularly called La Morenita, celebrates the Virgin Mary on the island of Tenerife, one of the Canary Islands (Spain). Our Lady of Candelaria is the patron saint of the Canary Islands.

The Basilica of Candelaria in Candelaria, Tenerife is considered to be the main church dedicated to the Virgin Mary in Canary Islands and has been a minor basilica since 2011. Her feast is celebrated on 2 February (Candlemas, Fiesta de la Candelaria) and 15 August as the patronal feast of the Canary Islands.

==== Spain: Catalonia ====
As in many regions in Spain, Catalonia has a weather proverb asserting that bad weather on Candlemas predicts good weather to come, and vice versa: Si la Candelera plora, l'hivern és fora; si la Candelera riu, l'hivern és viu ("If Candlemas cries, winter is gone; if Candlemas laughs, winter is alive")

Traditionally, Candlemas was identified in mountainous areas of Catalonia as the date that bears awake from hibernation: Per la Candelera, l'ós surt de l'ossera ("on Candlemas, the bear leaves its den"). Accordingly, bear festivals, where a man in a bear costume scares and annoys the populace, are celebrated in some areas of Catalonia around carnival. The original meaning was linked to the popular belief that they were held at Candlemas.

==== Sweden and Finland ====
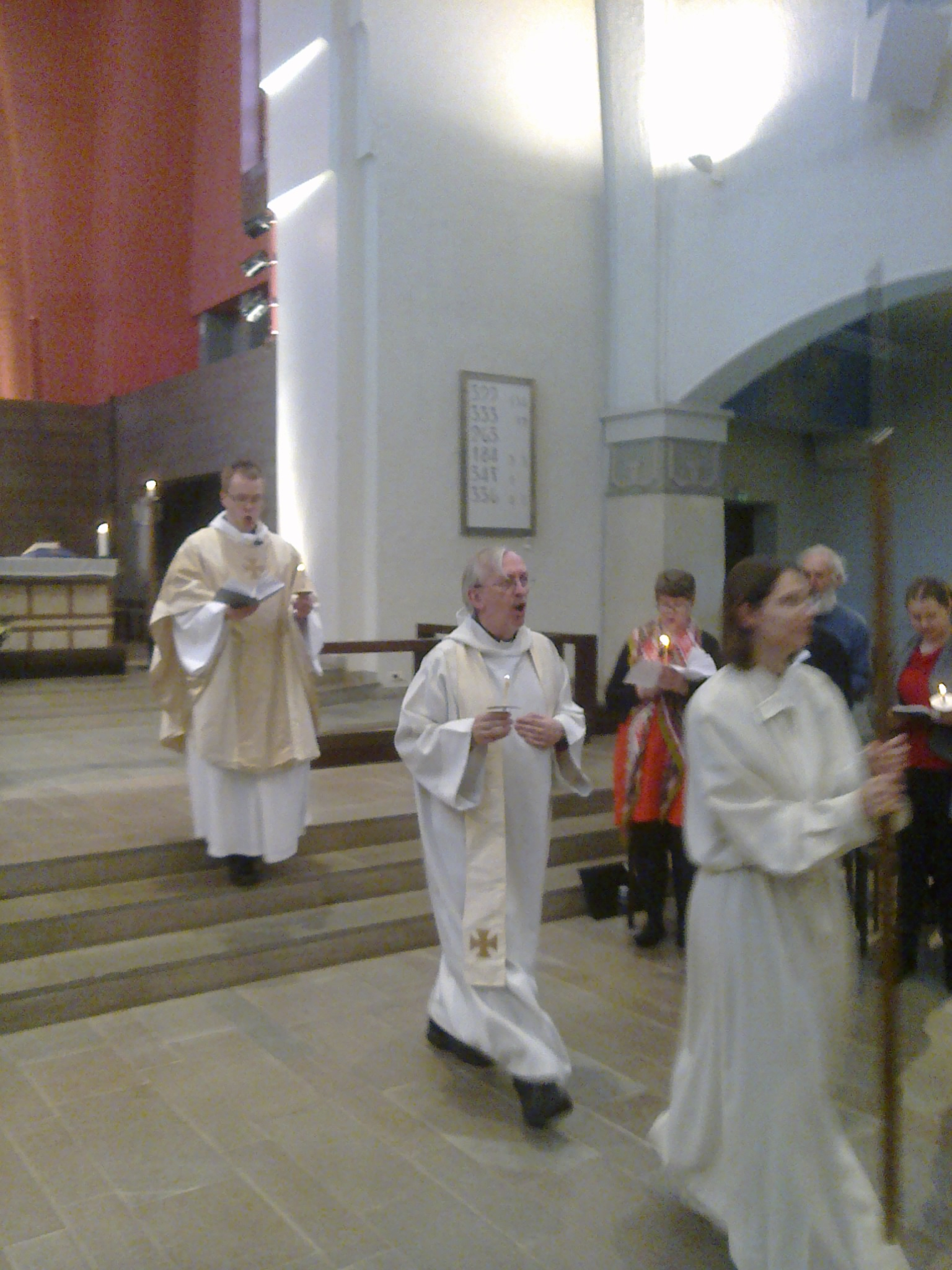
The recessional during Candlemas in Mikael Agricola Church, Finland (2015)

In Swedish and Finnish Lutheran churches, since 1774 Candlemas has been celebrated on the Sunday between 2 and 8 February inclusive. If this Sunday happens to be the last Sunday before Lent, i.e. Shrove Sunday or Quinquagesima (Swedish: Fastlagssöndagen, Finnish: Laskiaissunnuntai), Candlemas is celebrated one week earlier.

=== Americas ===
==== Guatemala ====
The Virgin of Candles is the patron saint of Jacaltenango, and her feast marks the end of the Christmas season.

==== Mexico ====
Dressing and adoration of the Christ Child and family meals with tamales on Candlemas are an important Mexican tradition. The customs of this feast is closely linked to that of the Epiphany, during which the tasting of the rosca de reyes (kings cake) will determine who is responsible for organizing La candelaria. Whoever finds the muñeco (bean-shaped Christ Child) in the cake is named godparent of the Christ child, who will then dress the niño dios (an image of the Christ child in the form of a doll) on Candlemas with richly decorated clothes. This Christ child is then brought to the church to be blessed. Memories of these events are often passed down from generation to generation in families.

Following this is the family meal. Whoever draws the bean on Epiphany must also prepare tamales, believed to echo Mexico's pre-Christian past with its offerings of maize. The whole family is invited to this meal (often the same people as for the Rosca at Epiphany), which gives the festival an aspect of family and sharing.

==== Peru ====
The Virgin of Candles is the patron saint of the city of Puno in Peru, held in the first fortnight of February each year. It is one of the largest festivals of culture, music, and dancing in Peru. In terms of the number of events related to the cultures of the Quechua and Aymara peoples and of the mestizos of the Altiplano, and also in terms of the number of people directly and indirectly involved in its realization, it stands with the Carnival in Rio de Janeiro and the Carnaval de Oruro in Bolivia as one of the three largest festivals in South America.

At the festival's core are music and dance performances organized by the Federación Regional de Folklore y Cultura de Puno, consisting of more than 200 dances in more than 150 dance sets. These include "native dances" from the various communities in Puno and sets of dances organized in different quarters of the city, mostly those known as "costume dances". These performances directly involve 40,000 dancers and some 5,000 musicians and indirectly involve about 25,000 people, including directors, sponsors, embroiderers, and the makers of masks, clothing, boots, shoes, bells, and other items, as well as the bandsmen and staff. Some dance groups are linked to uniformed organizations.

==== Puerto Rico ====
This festivity officially finalizes the end of Christmas for Catholic Christians in Puerto Rico; the festivities include a procession where the statue of Nuestra Señora de Candelaria (Our Lady of the Light) is carried on the shoulders. Others follow with lit candles until they reach the church where a Mass is celebrated. In the evening, the festivities may continue with a giant bonfire and singing. Some families in the countryside burn their dried Christmas trees on this date as a culmination of the holiday season.

=== Asia ===
==== Philippines ====
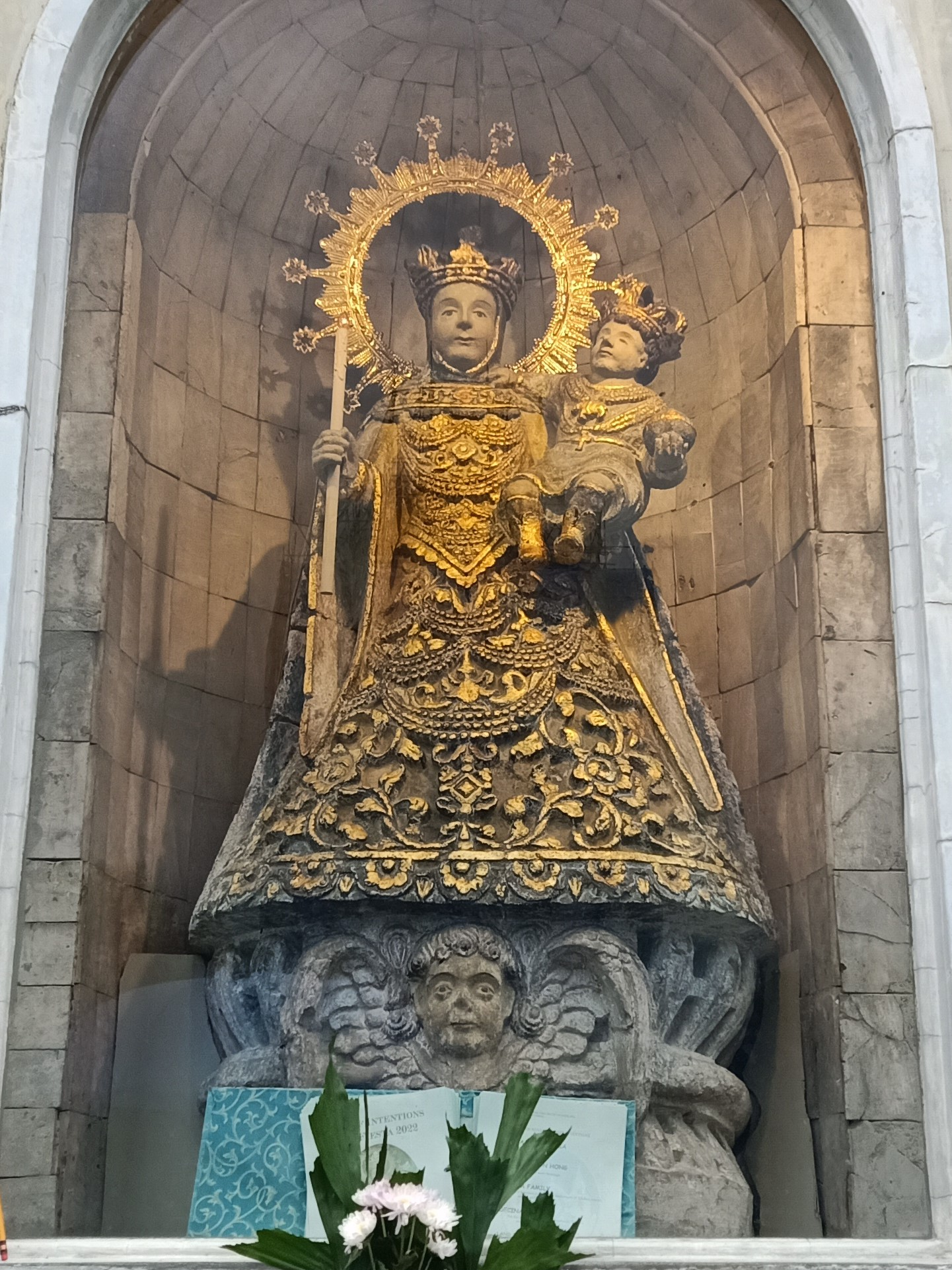
Our Lady of Candles at Jaro Cathedral, Iloilo City, Philippines

In the Philippines, Our Lady of Candles is the patroness of Western Visayas region. In Silang, Cavite, her feast is observed locally as a triduum from 1 to 3 February, with 2 February as the actual feast day.

For many Filipino Catholics, the Feast of Candelaria on 2 February marks the final close of the country's Christmas season, particularly in keeping with the practice of leaving nativity scenes displayed until this day.

== See also ==
- Imbolc
- Liturgical year
- Groundhog Day

== Bibliography ==
- Braden, Mark (2020). The Blessing of the Candles at Candlemas. Gottesdienst: The Journal of Lutheran Liturgy.
- Mergnac, Marie-Odile; Köhler, Thomas (2008). Proverbes et dictons de toujours (in French). Paris: Archives et cultures.
- Walter, Philippe (1989). La Mémoire du temps. Fêtes et calendriers de Chrétien de Troyes à la Mort Artur (in French). Paris: Champion. ISBN 9782051010337.
- Walter, Philippe (2011). Mythologie chrétienne (in French). Imago. Archived from the original on 20 December 2019.
