= Job of Pochayev =

Russian saint

Saint Job of Pochayev
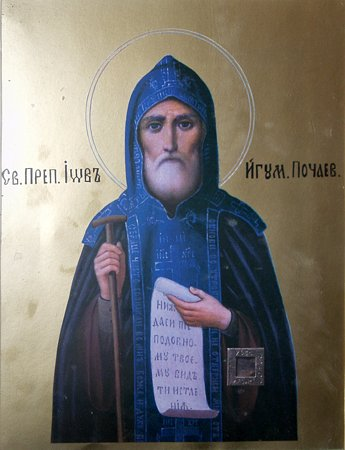
- Icon of the "Holy Venerable Job, Igumen of Pochayev" with relic inserted at lower right

Hegumen
- Born: c. 1551 near Kolomyia, Ruthenian Voivodeship, Kingdom of Poland
- Died: 28 October 1651; Pochayiv, Volhynian Voivodeship, Polish–Lithuanian Commonwealth
- Venerated in: Eastern Orthodox Church
- Major shrine: Pochayev Lavra
- Feast: October 10 (Synaxis); October 28 (Repose); May 6 (Feast day); August 28 (Uncovering of Relics)
- Attributes: Vested as a monk, holding an abbot's crozier

Job of Pochayev (Ukrainian: Йов Почаївський; c. 1551 – 28 October 1651), to the world Ivan Zalizo (Ukrainian: Іван Залізо), in Great Schema John (Ukrainian: Іоан) was an Eastern Orthodox monk and saint.

== Childhood and early years ==
Job was born around 1551 near the city of Kolomyia, Galicia, when it was within the Polish kingdom.

His pious parents John and Agapia of the Zalizo (lit. "Iron") family, named him Ivan (John) after John the Baptist. The lives of Rastko Nemanjić, John of Damascus and "The Ladder" by John Climacus were the models of virtuous life for the young Ivan. According to his biographer and disciple Dositheus, while he was young in years he was perfect in wisdom, and the boy differed from other children by his high spiritual aspirations, with never a contradiction in his words, knowledge and actions.

== Joining Uhornytskyi monastery ==
At the age of 10 he secretly left home for the Transfiguration Ugorniki Monastery, and asked the hegumen (abbot) to accept him to serve the brothers. When Ivan turned 12, he was tonsured as a monk and was given the name Job. Since then, he began to follow the example of the biblical character Job as a model of living. Reaching the age of 31 he was offered priestly ordination, which he accepted.

== Transfer to Dubno monastery and literary work ==
After the repeated offers of a local, Konstantin Ostrozhsky, the defender of Orthodoxy, he was transferred to the island monastery of the Exaltation of the Cross outside of Dubno that belonged to the duke's estates in the Rivne region. The monastery was arranged after the canons of Theodore the Studite. There, for 20 years, Job served as hegumen (abbot) and engaged himself in the writing of theological books.

The collection of his works, The Book of the Venerable Job of Pochayiv, Written by His Own Hand, contained 80 teachings, conversations, and sermons of St. Job, as well as excerpts he himself compiled from the writings of the Holy Fathers. It was translated into Russian and republished in 1881 under the title Pchela Pochayevskaya (The Bee of Pochayiv), edited by the professor of the Kiev Theological Academy, N. Petrov.

In his writings, Job defended Orthodoxy against the Protestant heresies (especially the Socinianists) that were spreading in western Malorossiya during his time, writing on the most important Orthodox dogmas of the Trinity, the divinity of Christ, about the Mother of God, baptism and everything that was rejected by Protestant missionaries.

Job also critiqued Roman Catholic teachings regarding the use of unleavened bread in the Eucharist, among other doctrinal differences in the face of Roman Catholic persecution of Orthodoxy following the Union of Brest (1596). Many Orthodox Christians living in Poland at the time were deprived of their rights, and attempts were made to force them to convert to Catholicism. A number of Orthodox bishops even became apostates to Uniatism. To counteract this problem, Job and others defended Orthodoxy by copying and disseminating Orthodox books. Prince Ostrozhsky was also responsible for the Ostrog Bible (1581), the first printed edition of the Bible in Church Slavonic.

== Hermit withdrawal to Pochayev ==
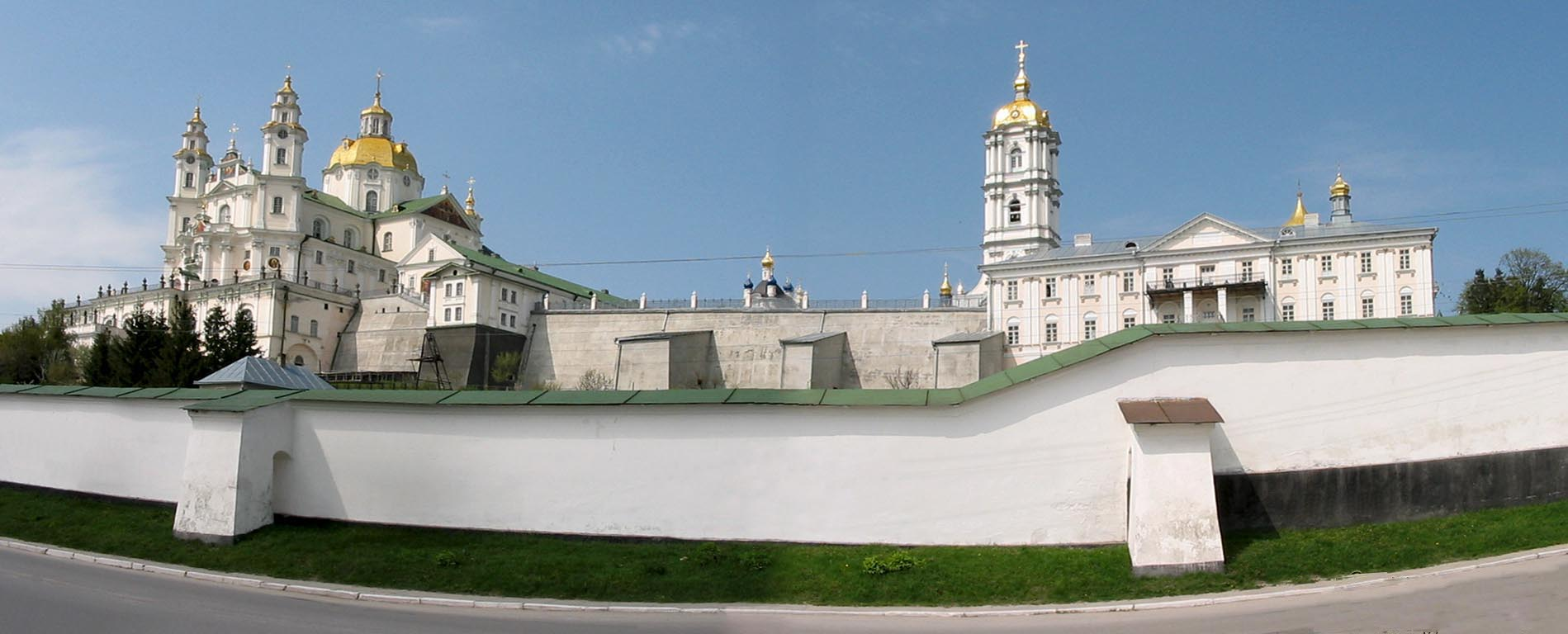
A view of the Pochayiv Lavra as it appears today.

On account of his growing fame, he decided to withdraw as a hermit into the mountain caves monastery at Pochayev in Kremenets district. Having joined the monastery in 1604, Job was eventually elected hegumen.

Job was quiet, brief in words, and the only sound heard from his lips was the Jesus prayer. For many days and weeks he would retreat into his locked cave, so narrow that entry is difficult, and so small that it was impossible to sit, stand or lie conveniently. From the long periods of kneeling, his knees were covered with wounds, and wearing knee-marks into the rock floor. His disciple Dosyfey recounts that he saw supernatural light coming from the depths of the cave, shining for two hours onto the opposite side of the church. Dosyfey records that at the sight he was terrified and fell to the ground.

Job introduced strict discipline and other reforms of monastic life. During his time in office, the monastery had to fend off incessant attacks by Andrzej Firlej, Castellan of Belz, who sued the monks over his grandmother's bequest of extensive lands and a miracle-working icon of the Mother of God. In 1623, Firlej raided the monastery, taking the holy icon with him and keeping it until 1641, when a court decision finally restituted the icon to the monks.

In 1628 Job attended the Synod of Kiev, called to defend the Orthodox Church against Uniatism.

Sometime after 1642, he was tonsured into the Great Schema, and received the new monastic name of John.

== Death and canonization ==
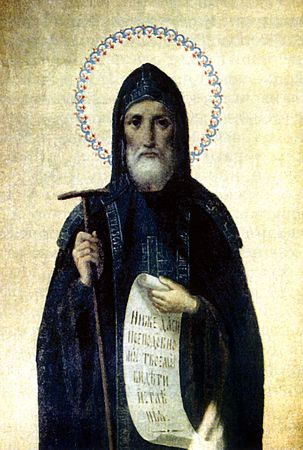
Icon of Saint Job of Pochayiv.

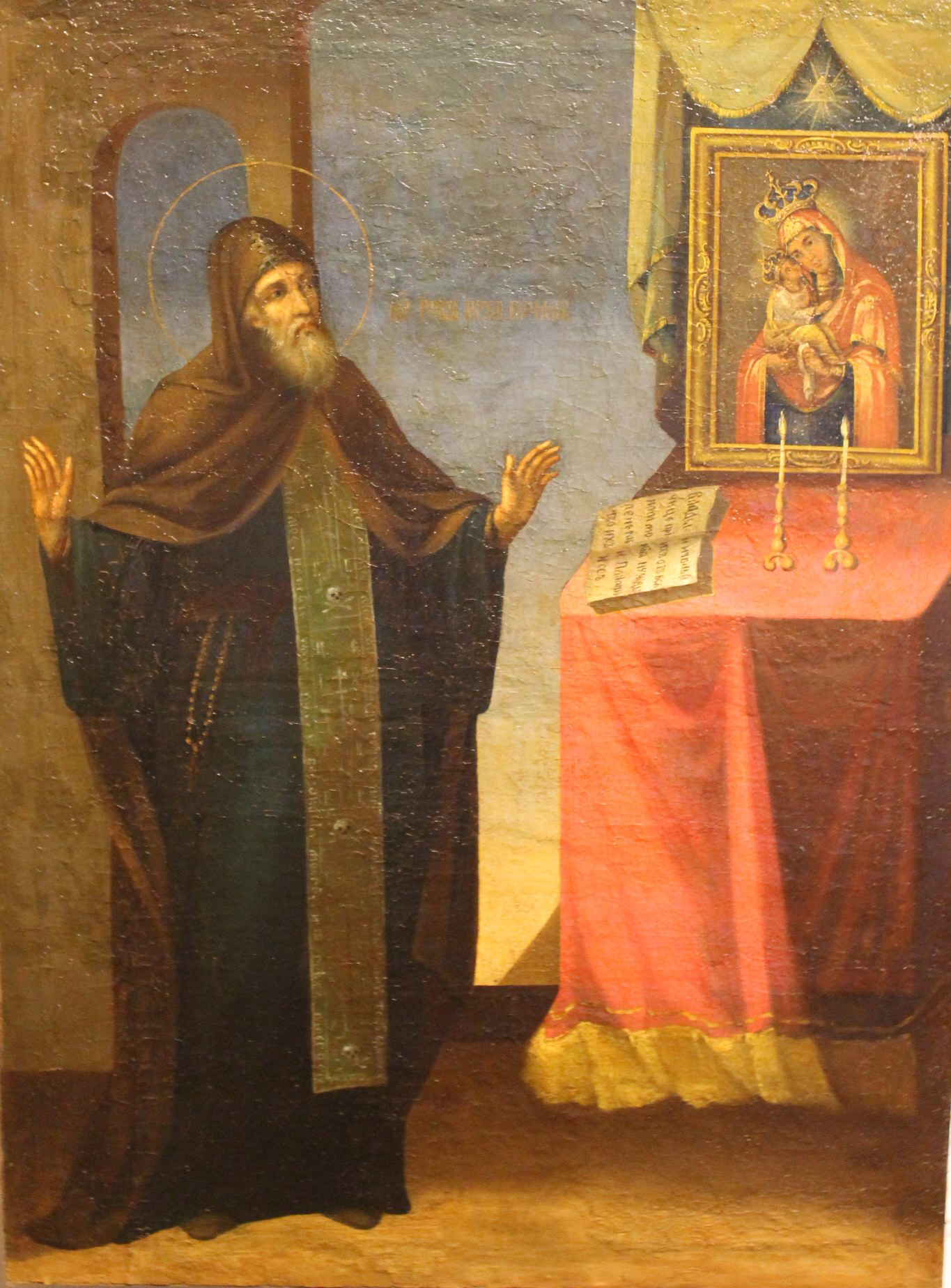
Job of Pochayev (1551–1651), the igumen of Pochayv Monastery. Oil, canvas, the end of the 19th century

Job died on 25 October 1651 and was glorified as a saint shortly thereafter. After his death, Job appeared three times in a vision to Dionysius Balaban, the Metropolitan of Kiev, and instructed him that God wanted the Metropolitan to uncover the saint's relics.

After the first two visions, Metropolitan Dionysius did not follow the order. Only after the third, when Job threatened him with misfortune should he continue to disobey, did Dionysius see in it God's will. The same day, the Metropolitan departed for Pochayev and gave orders to open the grave of Job immediately.

This took place on 28 August 1659. His body was found to be incorrupt, emitting a wonderful and heavenly fragrance. The relics were taken to the Trinity Cathedral of the Lavra for veneration.

A second "Uncovering of the Relics" of Job of Pochayev took place on 28 August 1833, at which his relics were solemnly transferred to a church consecrated to his honour which had been built at the Pochayev Lavra.

Every year, on 28 August a great number of Orthodox pilgrims come to Pochayev Lavra to honour Saint Job, venerate his relics, and ask for his intercession.

== Healings and miracles ==
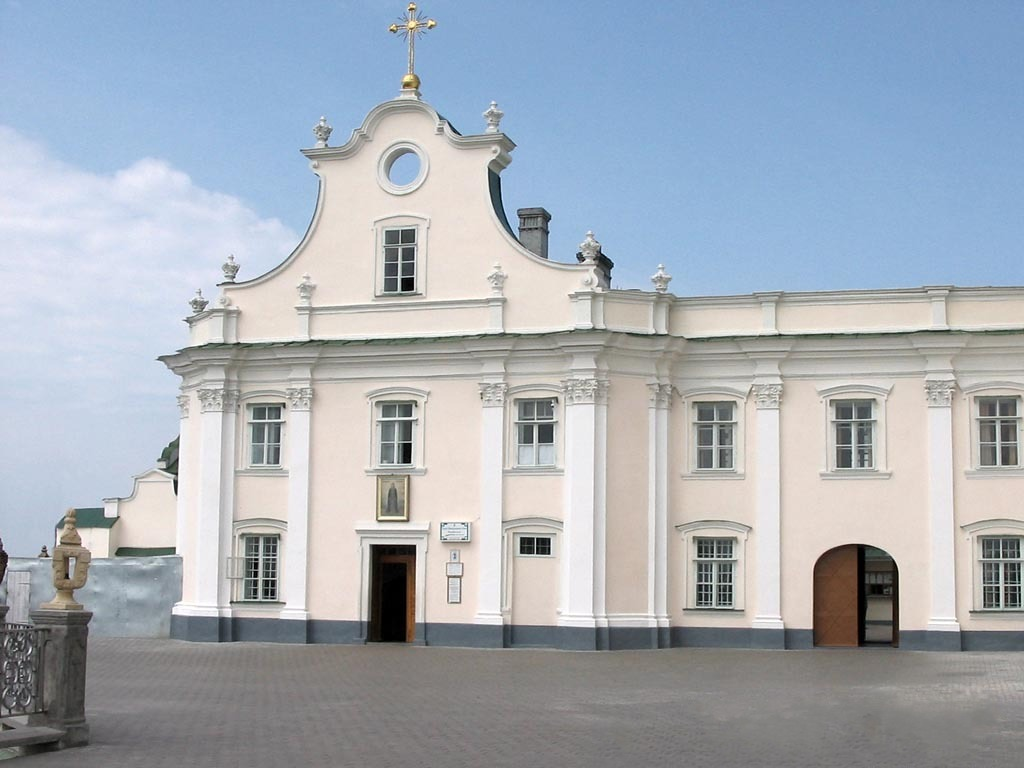
The Church dedicated to St. Job at the Pochayev Lavra.

During the Zbarazh War of 1675, the cloister was besieged by the Turks, who reputedly fled upon seeing the apparition of the Theotokos (Mother of God) accompanied by angels and Job. Numerous Turkish Muslims who witnessed the event during the siege converted to Christianity afterward. One of the monastery chapels commemorates this event.

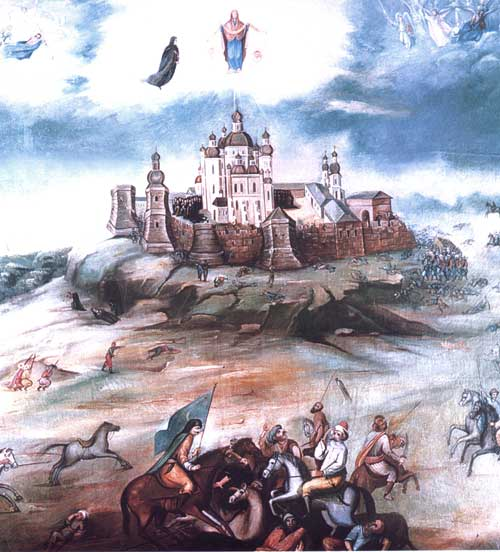
The Battle of Pochayev during the Zbarazh War in 1675. The Theotokos and Job are depicted above the monastery, defending the cloister while the battle rages below.

In 1759, a coach of Count Mikołaj Bazyli Potocki capsized near the monastery walls. In a fit of anger, Potocki fired at his driver three times, all without avail. Attributing this failure to divine intervention, Potocki settled in Pochayiv and started to lavish gifts upon the cloister.

In 1773, Potocki (who was a Roman Catholic) petitioned the Pope to recognize the Pochayev icon as miraculous and Job as a Catholic saint. Only the former petition was satisfied.

On 28 October 1908 when the Bishop of Volhynia and the faithful celebrated the feast day of Saint Job, Job repeatedly appeared in a vision in front of the bishop and blessed the Holy Mysteries (Body and Blood of Christ).

The cave church of St Job contains a famous gift from Countess Orlova - a silver reliquary with relics of the saint.

The Printshop of St. Job of Pochaev at Holy Trinity Monastery in Jordanville, New York, is dedicated to Job, and is the principal press of the Russian Orthodox Church Outside of Russia, publishing liturgical and spiritual works in Church Slavonic, Russian and English.

== Feast Days ==
The Eastern Orthodox Church celebrates his memory on October 28, the day of his repose (for those churches which follow the Julian Calendar October 28 falls on November 10 of the Gregorian Calendar, a difference of 13 days).

On August 28/September 10 the church celebrates the anniversary of the Uncovering of his Relics. In 1902, the Holy Synod decreed that on this day the holy relics of St Job be carried in procession around the Dormition Cathedral of the Pochaev Lavra after the Divine Liturgy.

and October 10/23 (as one of the seven saints commemorated on the Synaxis of the Saints of Volhynia).

== See also ==
- Pochayiv Lavra
