= Allammelech =

Biblical place

Alammelech is a Biblical place described in the Book of Joshua. It lies within Tribe of Asher land, between Achshaph and Amad.
