= Tribe of Asher =

One of the twelve Tribes of Israel

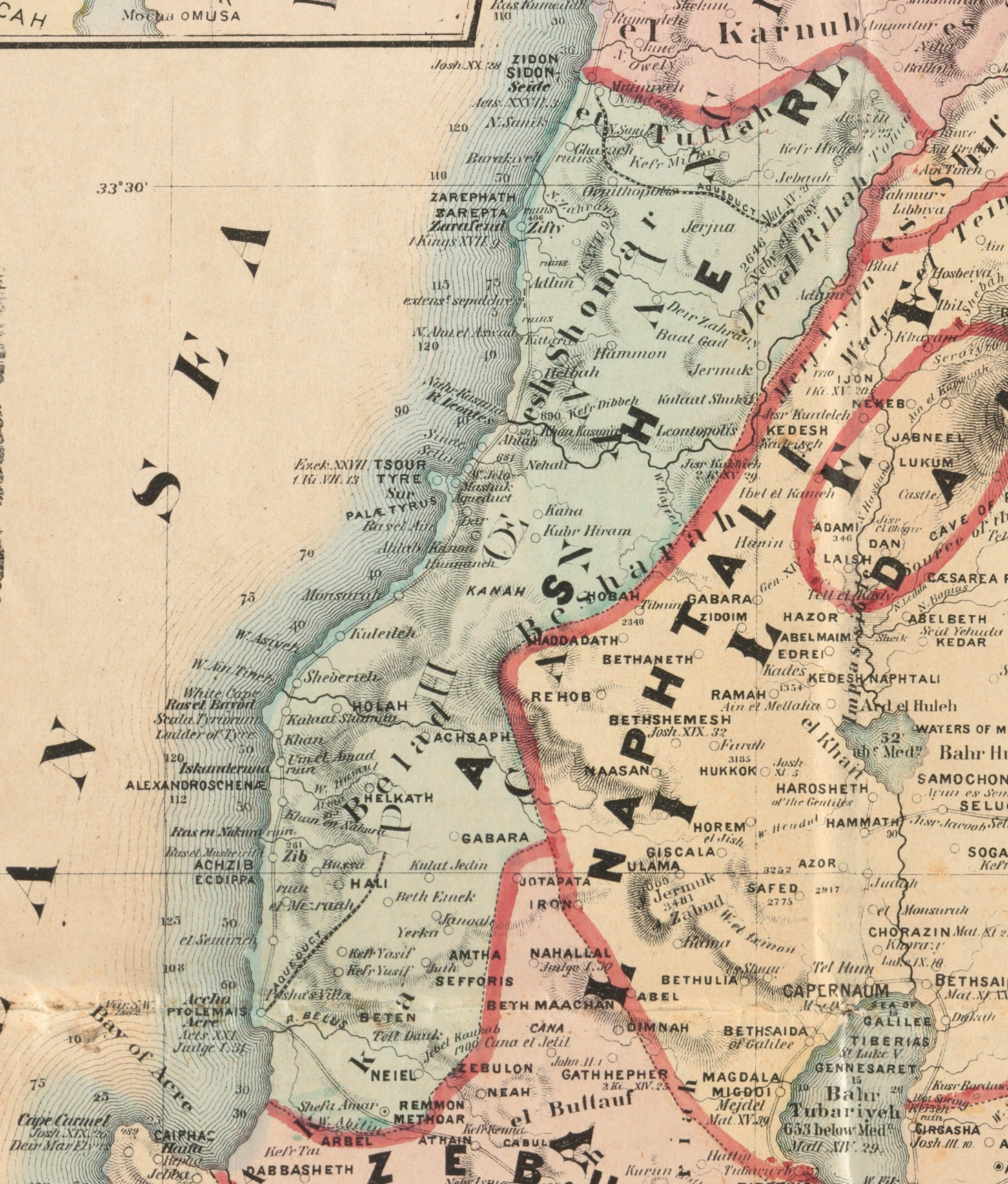
Territory of Asher, 1873 map

According to the Hebrew Bible, the Tribe of Asher was one of the Tribes of Israel descended from Asher (Hebrew: אָשֵׁר, Modern: ʼAšer, Tiberian: ʼĀšēr, "happy one"), the eighth son of Jacob. It is one of the ten lost tribes.

== Biblical narrative ==
According to the biblical Book of Joshua, following the completion of the conquest of Canaan by the Israelite tribes, Joshua allocated the land among the twelve tribes. According to biblical scholar Kenneth Kitchen, one should date this conquest slightly after 1200 BC. This is referred to as a 'late date' with the main alternative of around 1500 BC referred to as the 'early date' for both the Exodus and conquest of Canaan. In opposition to both of these views, many critical scholars hold that the conquest of Joshua as described in the Book of Joshua never occurred.

In the biblical account, Joshua assigned to Asher western and coastal Galilee, a region with comparatively low temperature and much rainfall, making it some of the most fertile land in Canaan, with rich pasture, wooded hills, and orchards; as such Asher became particularly prosperous, and known for its olive oil. The Blessing of Moses appears to prophesy this allocation, although textual scholars view this as a postdiction.

From after the conquest of the land by Joshua until the formation of the first Kingdom of Israel in c. 1050 BC, the Tribe of Asher formed a part of a loose confederation of Israelite tribes. No central government existed, and in times of crisis the people were led by ad hoc figures known as Judges (see the Book of Judges). With the growth of the threat from Philistine incursions, the Israelite tribes decided to form a strong centralized monarchy to meet the challenge, and the Tribe of Asher joined the new kingdom, which had Saul as its first king. After the death of Saul, all the tribes other than Judah remained loyal to the House of Saul, and followed his son Ish-bosheth, but after Ish-bosheth's death, the Tribe of Asher joined the other northern Israelite tribes in making David, who was then the king of Judah, king of a re-united Kingdom of Israel.

On the accession of Rehoboam, David's grandson, in c. 930 BC the northern tribes split from the House of David to re-form a Kingdom of Israel as the Northern Kingdom. Asher remained a member of the new kingdom until Assyria conquered its territory in c. 723 BC and deported the population. From that time, tradition has counted the Tribe of Asher as one of the Ten Lost Tribes of Israel.

The New Testament describes Anna the prophetess and her father, Phanuel, as belonging to the Tribe of Asher.

=== Family tree ===
Asher	Hadurah
Imnah	Ishvah	Ishvi	Beriah	Serah (daughter)
Heber	Malkiel

== Territory ==
Map of the twelve tribes of Israel; Asher is shaded green, in the north

Despite the connection to this general geographic region, it is difficult to determine from the Torah the exact boundaries of the tribe, to the extent that it is even uncertain whether Asher even had continuous territory. Sites which according to the Bible were allocated to Asher, and whose locations have since been identified, appear to be a scattered distribution of settlements rather than a compact and well-defined tribal region. Perhaps because of the situation that its territory was in the area that was controlled by Phoenicia, Asher appears, throughout its history, to have been fairly disconnected from the other tribes of Israel; additionally it seems to have taken little part in the antagonism portrayed in the Torah between the Canaanites and the other tribes, for example in the war involving Barak and Sisera.

The tribe of Aser [sic] had that part which was called the Valley, for such it was, and all that part which lay over against Sidon. The city of Arce belonged to their share, which is also named Actipus.

It seems that a part of the tribe resided in central Ephraim.

Critical scholars generally conclude that Asher consisted of certain clans that were affiliated with portions of the Israelite tribal confederation, but were never incorporated into the body politic. Another indication for this is that Asher together with Reuben and Gad (also detached) are the only tribes of which no person has ever been identified by name after the conquest and Asher and Gad are the only tribes not mentioned in the list of heads of tribes in I Chronicles 27.

=== Places ===
- Allammelech - a Biblical place described in the Book of Joshua.

== Immigration ==
Ethiopian Jews, also known as Beta Israel, claim descent from the Tribe of Dan, whose members migrated south along with members of the tribes of Gad, Asher, and Naphtali, into the Kingdom of Kush, now Ethiopia and Sudan, during the destruction of the First Temple.

== Archaeological context ==
Phoenicia encompassing Acre, Achzib, and Tyre, places associated with the Tribe of Asher. Saarisalo and Doak conclude that the Asher region can be associated with historical Phoenicia; however, the nature of the toponym remains unknown.

W. Max Müller suggested in his work Asien und Europa nach altägyptischen Denkmälern (1893) that the Egyptian topographical name 'Asru', which corresponds to the region of Western Galilee, might be associated with the Biblical Tribe of Asher. However, since 'Asru' corresponds to Seti I, who ruled before the arrival of the Israelites to the territory, Müller himself also challenges this possibility in the same work, it is also possible that region of Asher was not conquered by Israel but assimilated through contact instead. Theodore Nöldeke suggested that the name originally meant 'relic' or 'monument', as it is derived from the Semitic word for 'trace' or 'mark' by comparing it with the Arabic word ʔaṯṯar. Hence, the name was originally toponymical and became an ethnological term over time. Aapeli Saarisalo states that Asher, as described in Hebrew Bible, falls under the boundaries of Tyre and Acre which were important cities in the past, this possibly signifies that Asher was historical name for the locality that encompassed a region including Tell el-Fukhar (Kefar Akkho), Et-Tireh, Achshaph, Achziv and Kafr Manda; eventually lost connection to Israel and later on simply known part of Phoenicia however the local Jewish community seem to have flourished by the time of Josephus and possibly survived until Bar Kokhba revolt. Brian Doak simply states that places like Acre and Achziv were erroneously referred to as Asher in the Bible however they are "known" Phoenician places therefore concludes that tribe of Asher did not occupy territory in the region and the assessment is just faulty. Other theories include association of the Asher with Asshur and Heber, however these theories does not align with previous etymological assessments and the topological nature of the word therefore they seem to be only speculative and relies on outdated information on the matter. Ultimately, the historical reality behind the tribe of Asher is unknown.
