= Pelagius of Constance =

German saint

Saint Pelagius of Constance
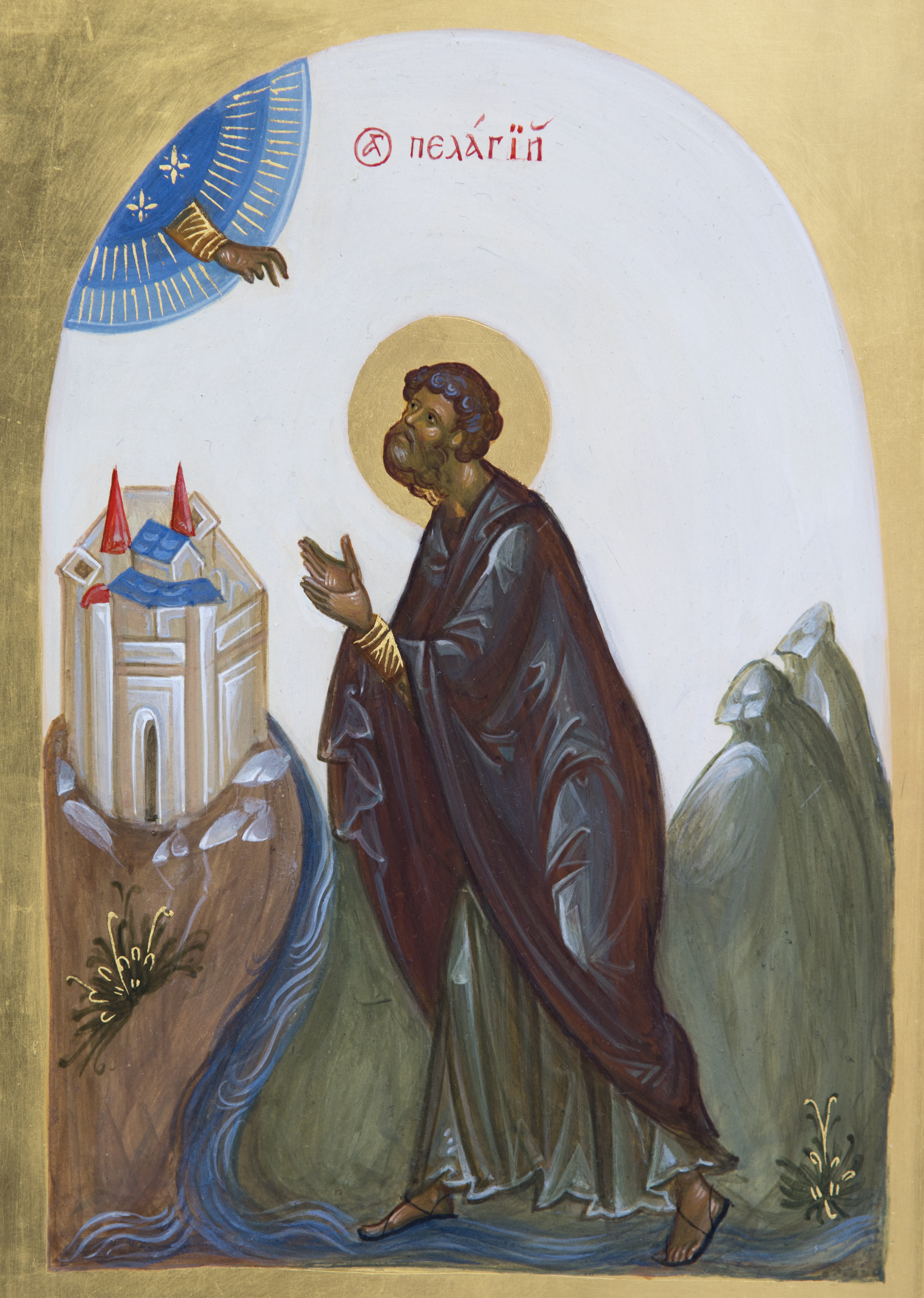
- Contemporary Russian Orthodox icon of St. Pelagius in the Russian Orthodox Church of the Resurrection, Zürich

Hieromartyr
- Born: 3rd century
- Died: c. 283
- Venerated in: Eastern Orthodox Church; Roman Catholic church
- Feast: 28 August
- Patronage: Konstanz, Switzerland

Pelagius of Constance (died c. 283) was an early Christian deacon and martyr who was martyred during the reign of the Roman emperor Numerian. He is considered as a saint in the Eastern Orthodox Church and Roman Catholic church, with a feast day on 28 August.

== Biography ==
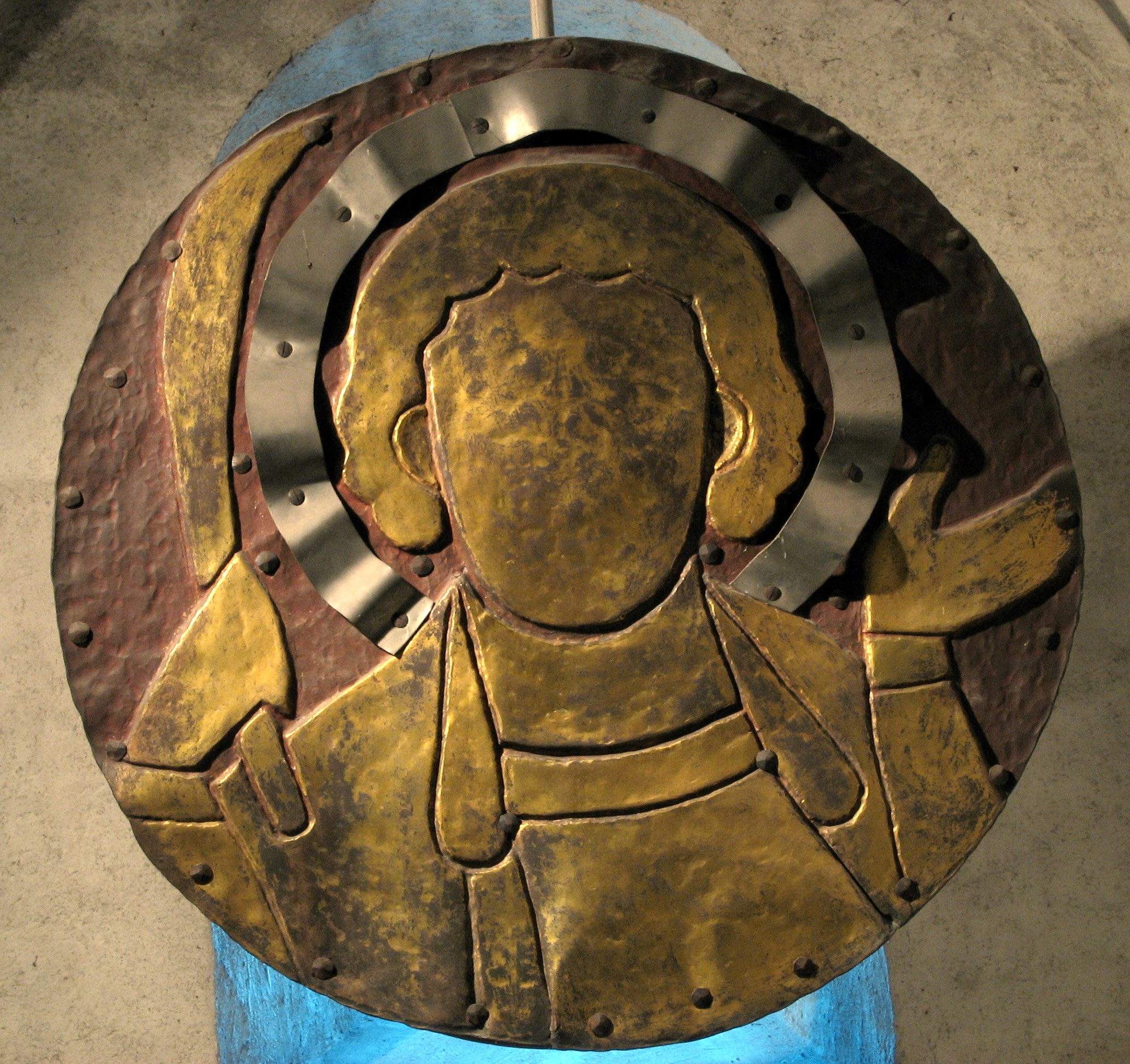
Medieval depiction of Pelagius in the Cathedral of Konstanz

Pelagius was born to his wealthy Christian parents from Pannonia. He was a deacon and was martyred as a young adult after enduring severe torture during the persecution of Christians under Emperor Numerian. Besides this, not much else, if anything, is known about his life.

== Veneration ==
He is venerated as a saint in the Eastern Orthodox Church and Roman Catholic church. His feast day is commemorated on 28 August. He was first venerated in Novigrad (Cittanova) in Istria, Croatia.

Pelagius is the patron saint of Konstanz and the Cathedral of Konstanz, owing to the transfer of relics that were believed to be his to that city before or around 904 AD. He usually does not have a face in his depictions.

== Gallery ==
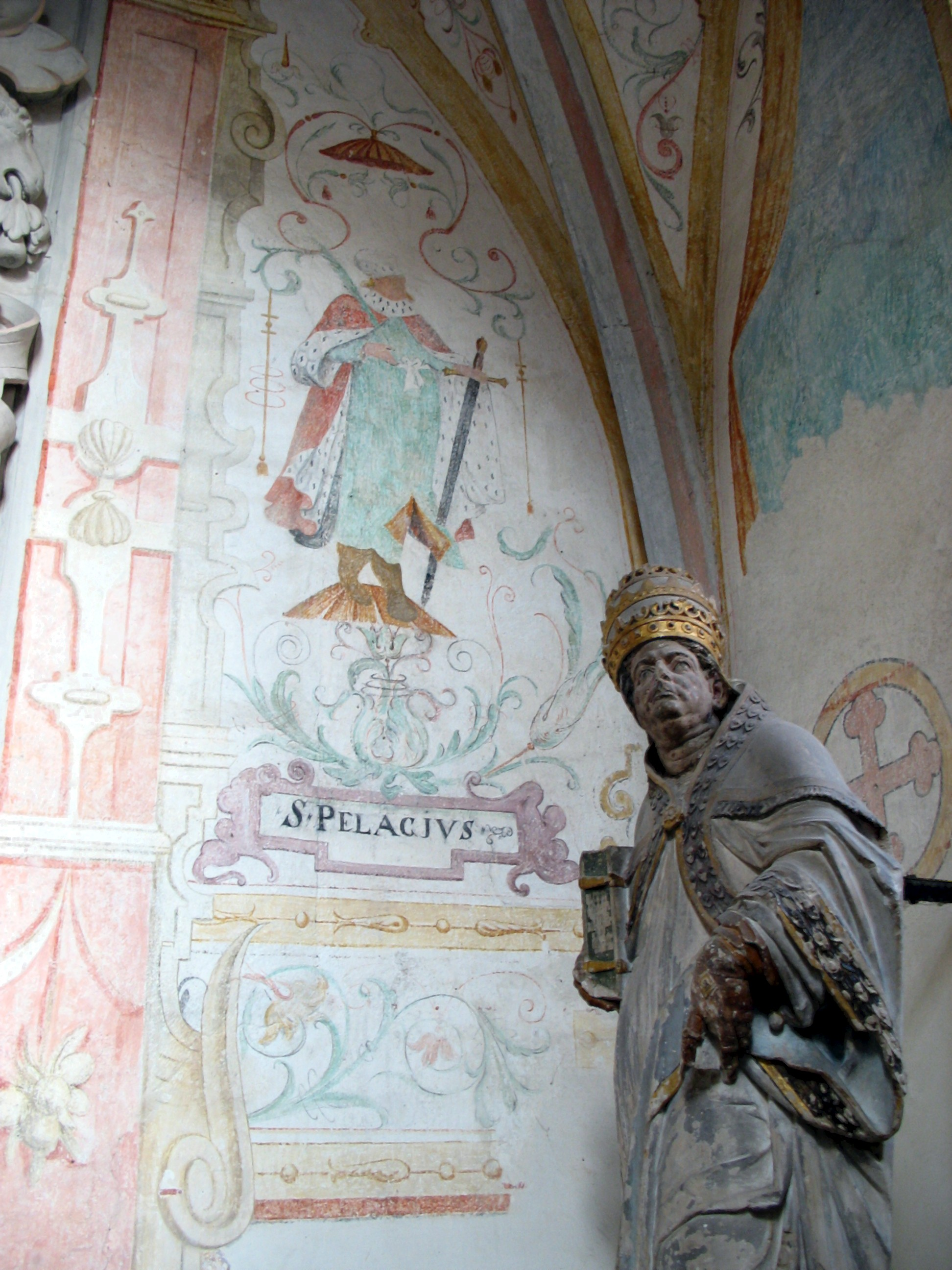
A 16th century wall painting of St. Pelagius

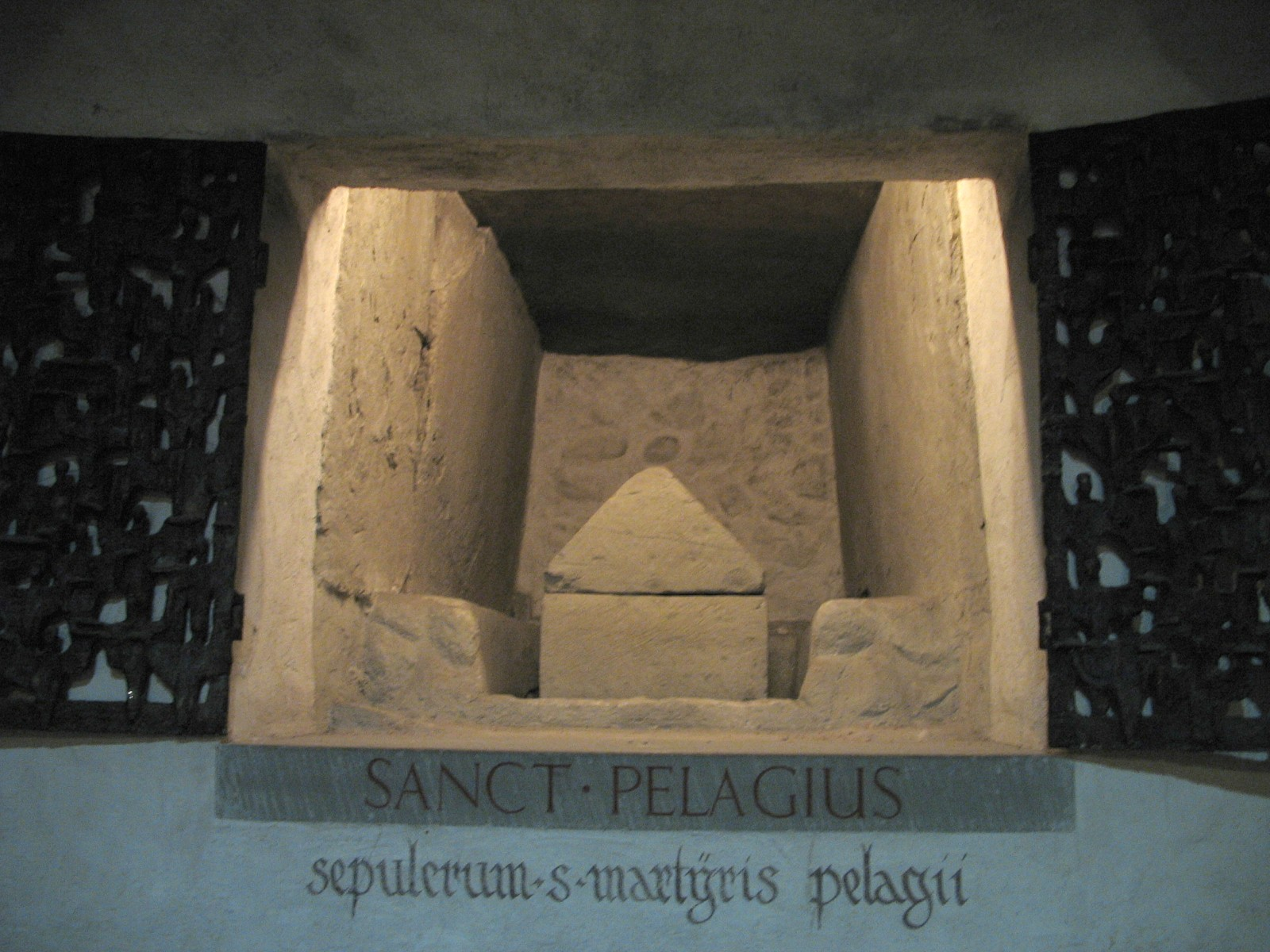
Tomb in the Cathedral of Constance where Pelagius' relics were kept at least until the Reformation
