= Konstanz Minster =

Historic cathedral in Konstanz, Baden-Württemberg, Germany

Coordinates: 47°39′48″N 9°10′35″E

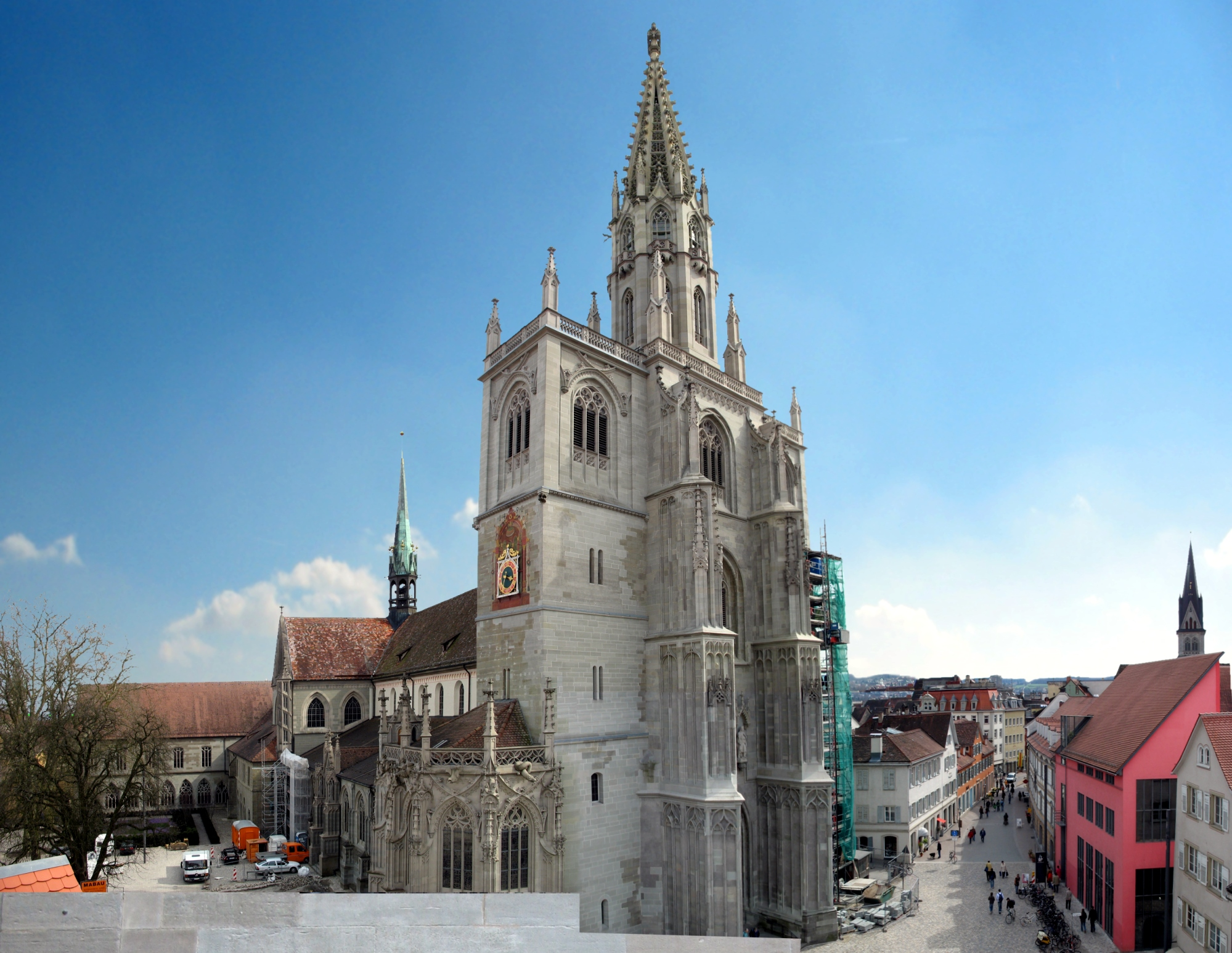
Konstanz Minster seen from north-west

Konstanz Minster or Konstanz Cathedral (German: Konstanzer Münster) is a historical building in Konstanz, southern Germany, the proto-cathedral of the former Roman Catholic diocese of Konstanz (dissolved in 1821).

== History ==
The first mention of a church in Konstanz dedicated to the Virgin Mary was in 615. Documentary confirmation of the Episcopal church Ecclesia sanctae Mariae urbis Constantiae is dated to the mid 8th century. There is clear evidence indicating that it was located on the Cathedral Hill, where a late Romanesque fortification with an adjoining civilian settlement had been established. In 780, the church was mentioned in a confirmation of a contract by Charlemagne.

St Maurice’s Rotunda (Holy Sepulchre) was built in 940 on orders of Bishop Konrad (934 - 975) who was canonized in 1123. The relics of Saint Pelagius were also kept in the minster.

In 1052, the cathedral collapsed. Its reconstruction took place under Bishop Rumold von Konstanz (1051 - 1069), with the eastern transept and three naves separated by 16 monoliths.

The next 300 years saw the construction of one tower, followed by the second, then a great fire destroyed one tower along with parts of the basilica as well as 96 other houses in the city. The south tower was completed in 1378.

From 1414 to 1418 the cathedral hosted the Council of Constance, the most important assembly of the Church during the Middle Ages, and the only one on German soil. Martin V, who had been elected Pope by the Conclave and thereby ending the schism dividing the Church, was enthroned in this Cathedral in 1417.

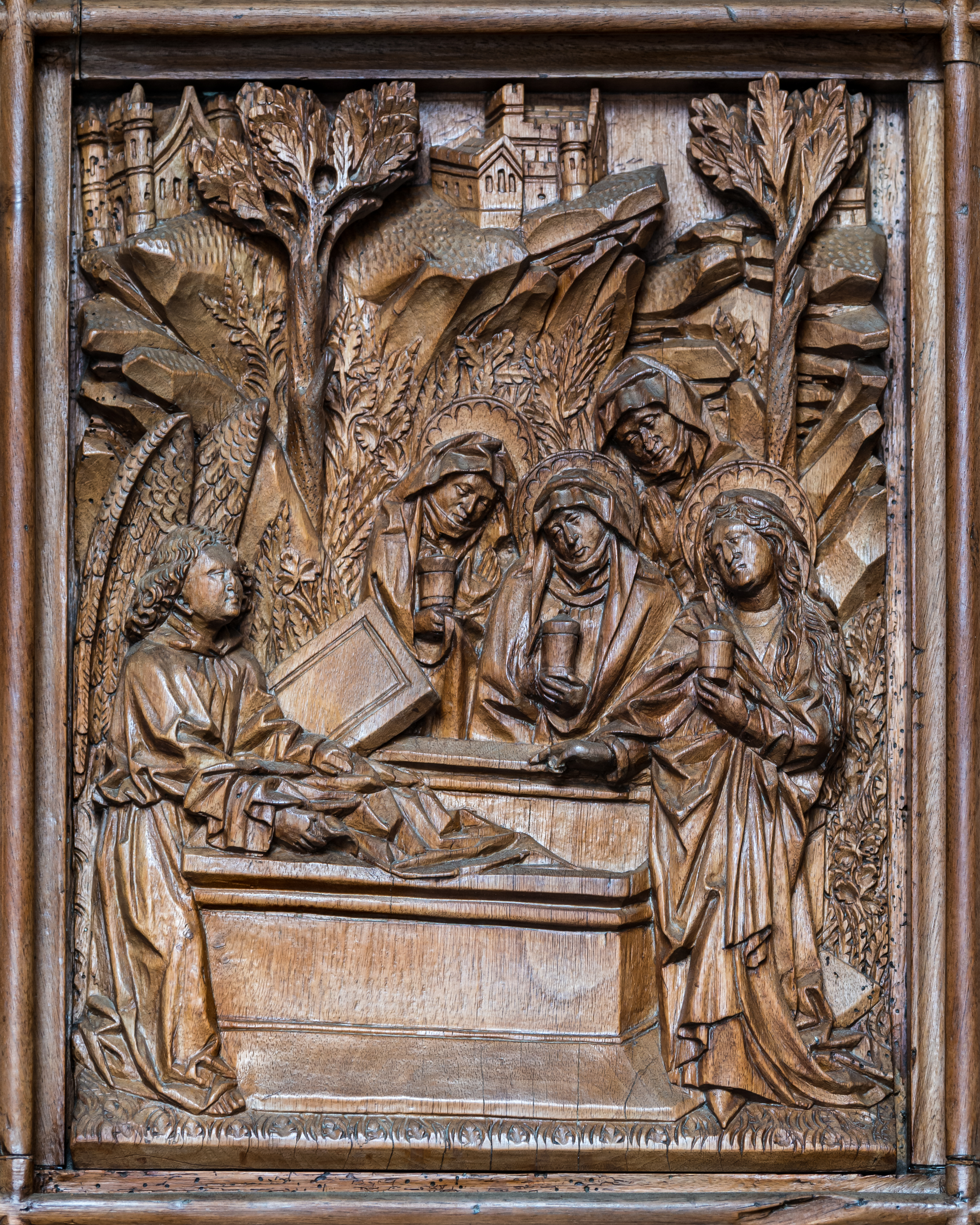
The three Marys at the Tomb of Christ, on the west portal. Simon Haider, 1470.

In 1415 Jan Hus, because of his teachings, was condemned as a heretic by the Council who, at this time, was without a Pope. He was then delivered to the secular power who condemned him to death, tied him to a stake and publicly burnt him alive.

Between 1418 and 1525, the Cathedral was adapted to Gothic style by master craftsmen. In the period from 1526 to 1551, the Bishop left Konstanz because of the Reformation, and moved his See across the lake to the Martinsburg in Meersburg. The radical iconoclasm instigated by the reformer Huldrych Zwingli in nearby Zurich, caused the destruction of artwork in the Cathedral.

The subsequent centuries saw the addition of more paintings, wrought iron gates and sculptures, as well as the replacement and repair of destroyed items. A new pipe organ was built by Daniel Hayl the elder in 1591-1592. Also Of note is the replacement of the painted Romanesque wooden ceiling by brick vaulting in 1637.

In 1821, Konstanz's bishopric, the largest in Germany, was dissolved and, in 1827, moved to Freiburg in the Breisgau. It had served the people around Lake Constance (Bodensee) for 1200 years, and survived almost 100 bishops. General restoration work took place on the Cathedral from 1844 to 1860; the tower was raised in neo-Gothic architectural style.

In 1955 Pope Pius XII raised the Cathedral to a papal Basilica Minor. A restoration program of the Cathedral’s interior as well as exterior started in 1962 and was expected to be completed by 2010. In 1966, twelve new bells were cast and hung in the center tower and the ridge turret, a present from the state of Baden-Württemberg.

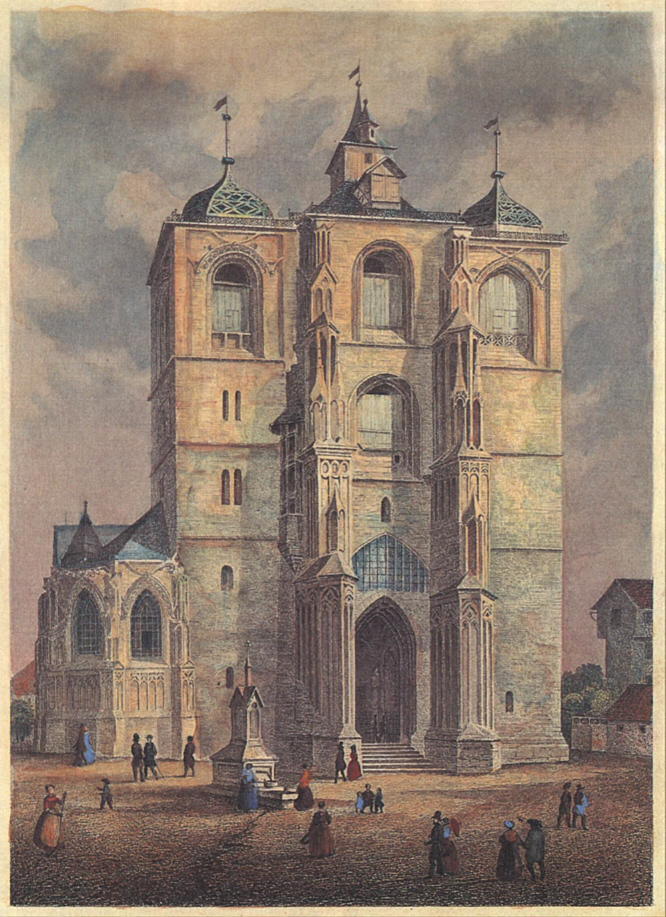
The façade in 1840

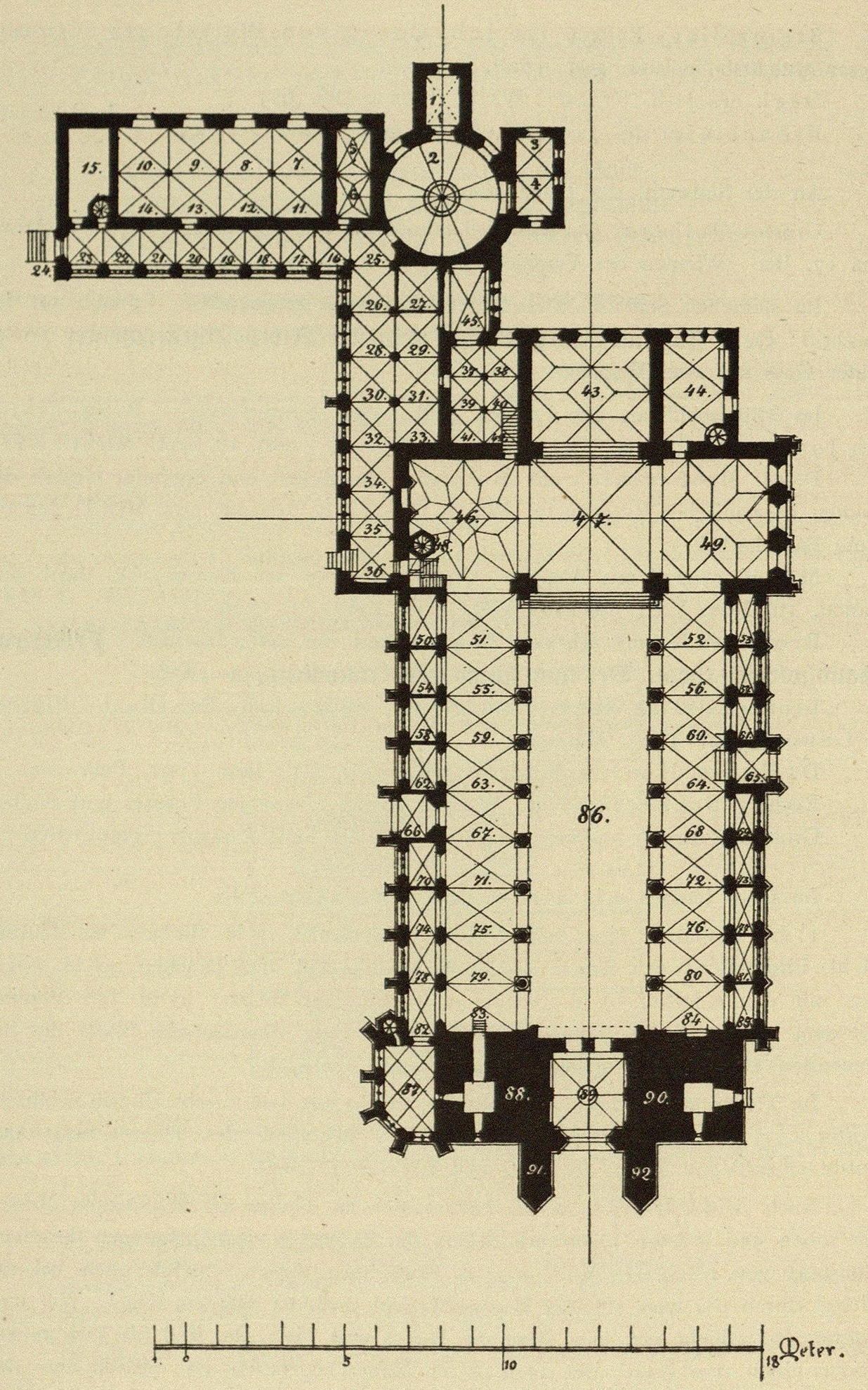
Plan of the cathedral

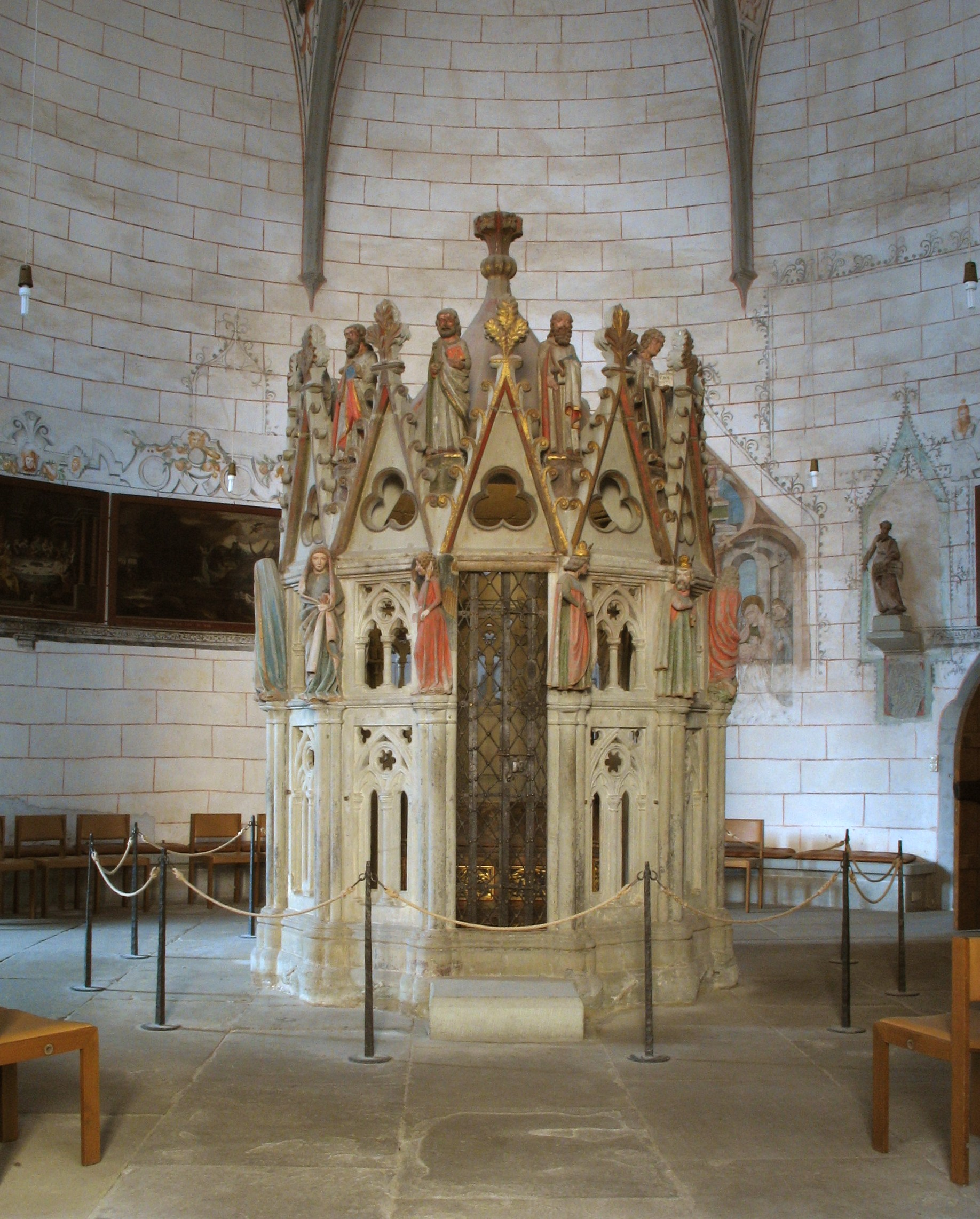
St Maurice's Rotunda

== Bells ==
The tower houses 19 bells. With a total weight of approximately 35 tons, it is the second largest peal of bells in Germany after the Cologne Cathedral peal. The largest or bourdon bell is named Sancta Maria. In Germany, the bells are always numbered from largest to smallest, Bell 1 is always the tenor or bourdon. Two of the bells serve for the clock, Bell 4 chimes for the quarter hour while Bell 3 chimes each the number of a full hour.

Bell number	Bell name (English)	Mass	Tower location
1	Sancta Maria (Bourdon)	8349 kg	Middle (bottom)
2	Ursula	7000 kg	South
3	Conradus	3450 kg	Middle (bottom)
4	Gebhardus	2260 kg	Middle (bottom)
5	Pelagius	1856 kg	middle (m.)
6	Henricus Suso	1293 kg	middle (m.)
7	Pius X	892 kg	middle (m.)
8	John the Baptist	734 kg	middle (above)
9	Paul	507 kg	middle (m.)
10	Peter and Paul	339 kg	middle (above)
