= Anna the Prophetess =

Biblical figure in the Gospel of Luke

Saint Anna the Prophetess
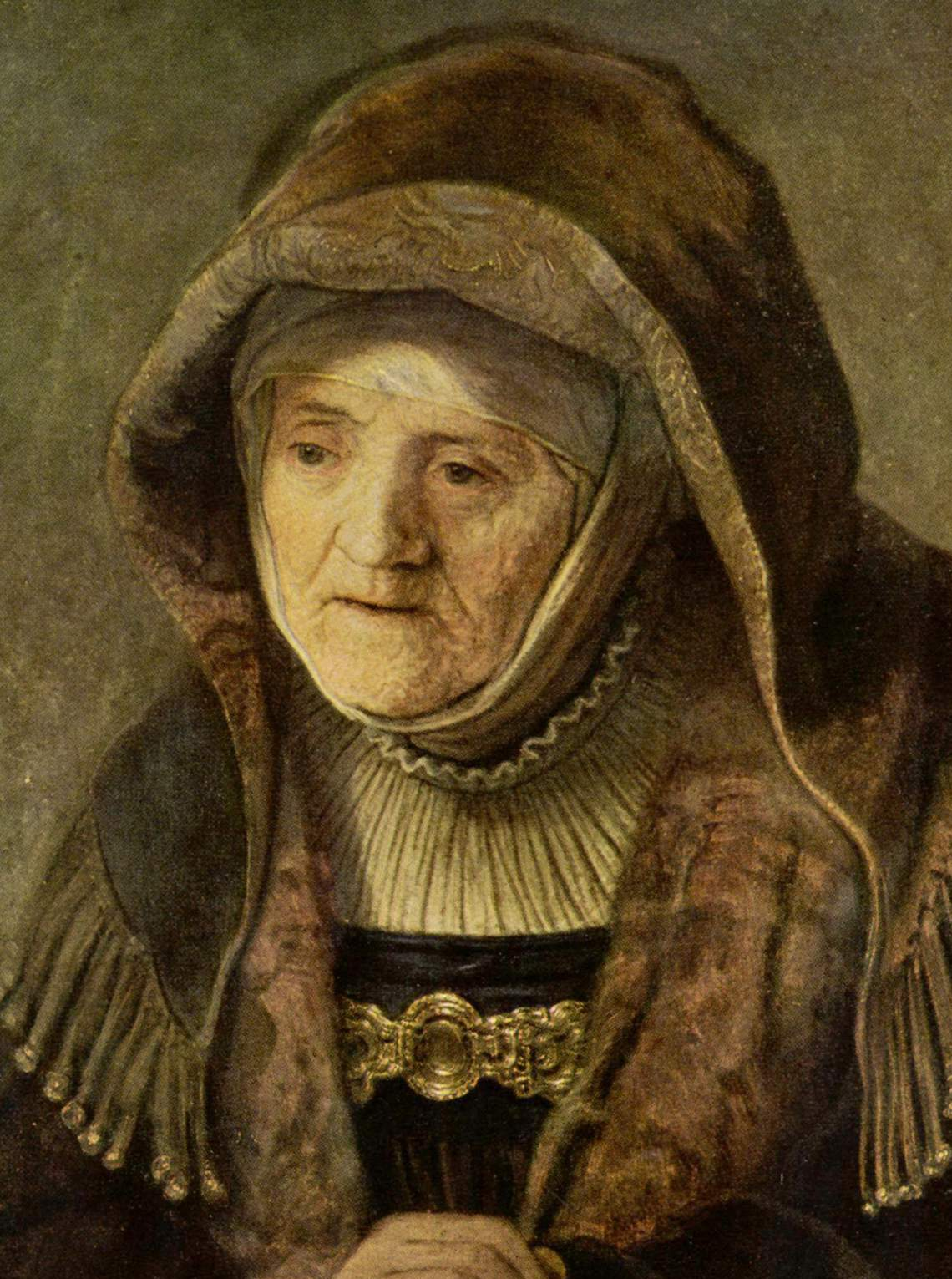
- The prophetess Anna (1639) by Rembrandt, Kunsthistorisches Museum

Prophetess
- Born: 1st century BC
- Died: 1st century
- Venerated in: Catholic Church; Eastern Orthodox Church; Oriental Orthodox Church
- Feast: 3 February; 1 September and 16 February on some calendars

Anna (Hebrew: חַנָּה, Ḥana; Ancient Greek: Ἄννα, Ánna), distinguished as Anna the Prophetess, is a woman mentioned in the Gospel of Luke. According to that Gospel, she was an elderly woman of the Tribe of Asher who prophesied about Jesus at the Temple of Jerusalem. She appears in Luke 2:36–38 during the presentation of Jesus at the Temple.

== New Testament ==
The passage mentioning Anna is as follows:

Luke 2:36–38 There was also a prophet, Anna, the daughter of Phanuel, of the tribe of Asher. She was very old; she had lived with her husband seven years after her marriage, and then was a widow until she was eighty-four.[*] She never left the temple but worshiped night and day, fasting and praying. Coming up to them at that very moment, she gave thanks to God and spoke about the child to all who were looking forward to the redemption of Jerusalem.

- Footnote: Or then had been a widow for eighty-four years. (New International Version)

From these three verses in Luke, the following is known of Anna:

- She was a prophetess.
- She was a daughter of Phanuel.
- She was a member of the tribe of Asher.
- She was widowed after seven years of marriage (her husband is not named).
- She was a devout Asherite Hebrew who regularly practiced prayer and fasting.

Luke describes Anna as "very old". Many Bibles and older commentaries interpret the New Testament text to state that she was 84 years old.

The Greek text states καὶ αὐτὴ χήρα ὡς ἐτῶν ὀγδοηκοντατεσσάρων, generally translated as "she was a widow of eighty four years". The passage is ambiguous: it could mean that she was 84 years old, or that she had been a widow for 84 years. Some scholars consider the latter to be the more likely option, in which case she would likely have been around 105 years old.

== Church traditions and veneration ==
The Catholic Church and Eastern Orthodox Church commemorate Anna as a saint, Anna the Prophetess. The Eastern Orthodox Church considers Anna and Simeon the God-Receiver as the last prophets of Old Testament and observes their feast on February 3/February 16 as the synaxis (afterfeast) following the Presentation of Christ, which Orthodox tradition calls "The Meeting of Our Lord and God and Savior, Jesus Christ". Along with Simeon, the prophetess Anna is commemorated on February 3 in the Byzantine rite of the Catholic Church.

She is also depicted in icons of the Presentation of Christ, together with the Holy Child and the Virgin Mary, Joseph and Simeon the God-Receiver. Orthodox tradition considers that Christ met his people, Israel, in the persons of Simeon and Anna.
