= Phanuel =

Biblical character from the Gospel of Luke

Phanuel (Greek: Φανουήλ Phanouēl) or Penuel (Hebrew: פְּנוּאֵל Pənū’êl) was the father of Anna the Prophetess. He is mentioned once only in the New Testament, in Luke 2 (Luke 2:36). He was a member of the Tribe of Asher and his name means "Face of God".

Theologian John Gill supposed that "this man might be a person of some note, or he may be mentioned for the sake of his name, which signifies the face of God, and is the name Jacob gave to a certain place where he had seen God face to face" (Genesis 32:30). As Anna was herself 'very old', it can be assumed that Phanuel was not still alive at the time of Anna's encounter with the child Jesus in the Temple (Luke 2:38).
