= Synaxis =

Liturgical assembly in Eastern Christianity

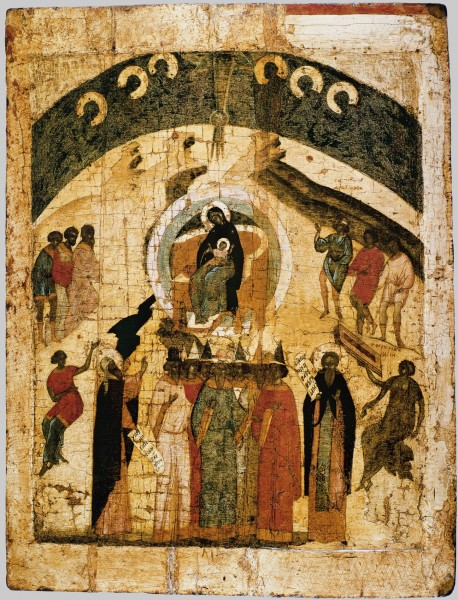
Icon of the Synaxis of the Theotokos (Pskov, 17th century)

A synaxis (Greek: σύναξις "gathering"; Slavonic: собор, sobor) is a liturgical assembly in Eastern Christianity (the Eastern Orthodox Church and those Eastern Catholic Churches which follow the Byzantine Rite).

== Synaxes of feast days ==
In Constantinople, the clergy and faithful would often gather together on specific feast days at a church dedicated to the saint of that day for liturgical celebrations. These gatherings were referred to as synaxes. These synaxes came to have services written specifically for them. A Synaxis often occurs on the day following a Major Feast Day and is in honor of saints who participated in the event. For example, services on the Feast of Theophany (the revelation of the Trinity at the Baptism of Jesus in the Jordan) would be held at Hagia Sophia; then, the next day, a Synaxis was observed in honor of St. John the Forerunner at the church dedicated to him. Over time, the synaxes came into general use and are now celebrated in every church.

Synaxis can also refer to a common commemoration of a number of saints in a single service, such as the Synaxis of the Seventy Apostles. Each individual saint may have his or her own separate feast day, but they are all commemorated together on their synaxis.

Most synaxes are observed as fixed feasts, being celebrated on the same calendar date year after year, though some occur on the nearest Sunday to a particular date. Other synaxes are celebrated on the Paschal cycle, moving backward or forward in the calendar according to the date of Pascha (Easter) that year.

=== Rite of Constantinople ===
The following are Synaxes which are universally observed in the Rite of Constantinople:

- Synaxis of the Theotokos (December 26)
- Synaxis of the Seventy Apostles (January 4)
- Synaxis of the Forerunner (January 7)
- Synaxis of the Holy Fathers of the Sixth Ecumenical Council (January 23)
- Synaxis of the Three Great Hierarchs (January 30)
- Synaxis of the Archangel Gabriel (March 26 and July 13)
- Synaxis of the Holy Fathers of the Second Ecumenical Council (May 22)
- Synaxis of the Holy Fathers of the First Ecumenical Council (Sunday before Pentecost)
- Synaxis of All Saints (first Sunday after Pentecost)
- Synaxis of the Twelve Apostles (June 30)
- Synaxis of the Holy Fathers of the Fifth Ecumenical Council (July 25)
- Synaxis of the Holy Fathers of the Third Ecumenical Council (September 9)
- Synaxis of the Holy Fathers of the Seventh Ecumenical Council (Sunday on or after October 8)
- Synaxis of the Holy Unmercenaries (November 1)
- Synaxis of the Archangel Michael and the Other Bodiless Powers (November 8)

=== Local observance ===
There are also synaxes which have been composed for local observance:

- Synaxis of the Saints of Kostroma (January 23)
- Synaxis of the Hierarchs of Novgorod (February 10, October 4, and the third Sunday after Pentecost)
- Synaxis of the Venerable Fathers of the Kiev Caves Lavra (second Sunday of Great Lent)
- Synaxis of the Rostov and Yaroslavl (May 23)
- Synaxis of the Saints of Ryzan (June 10)
- Synaxis of the Saints of Siberia (June 10)
- Synaxis of the Saints of Belarus (June 14)
- Synaxis of the Saints of North America (second Sunday after Pentecost)
- Synaxis of All Saints of Pskov (third Sunday after Pentecost)
- Synaxis of the Saints of Vladimir (June 23)
- Synaxis of the Saints of Tver (first Sunday after June 29))
- Synaxis of the Saints of Radonezh (July 6)
- Synaxis of the Saints of Smolensk (Sunday closest to July 23)
- Synaxis of the Saints of Solovki Monastery (August 9)
- Synaxis of All Saints of Moscow (Sunday before August 26)
- Synaxis of the Venerable Fathers of the Far Caves in Kiev (August 28)
- Synaxis of All Saints of Serbia (August 28)
- Synaxis of the Serbian Hierarchs (August 30)
- Synaxis of the Saints of Tula (September 22)
- Synaxis of All Saints of Alaska (September 24)
- Synaxis of the Venerable Fathers of the Near Caves in Kiev (September 28)
- Synaxis of the Hierarchs of Kazan (October 4)
- Synaxis of the Hierarchs of Moscow (October 5)
- Synaxis of the Saints of Volhynia (October 10)
- Synaxis of the Venerable Fathers of Optina (October 11)
- Synaxis of the Enlighteners of Karelia (Saturday between October 31 and November 6)
- Synaxis of the Saints of Georgia (December 11)

== See also ==
- Solemnity
