= Kubel =

Kubel or Kübel is a German language occupational surname for a cooper or barrel maker. Notable people with the name include:

- Alfred Kubel (1909–1999), German politician
- Jason Kubel (born 1982), American former professional baseball player
- Karl Kübel (1909–2006), German entrepreneur, philanthropist and benefactor
- Lothar von Kübel (1823–1881), German Roman Catholic clergyman
- Nicolas Aubé-Kubel (born 1996), Canadian professional ice hockey right winger
