= Ignaz Anton Demeter =

German archbishop and church musician (1773–1842)

- Archbishop of Freiburg im Breisgau
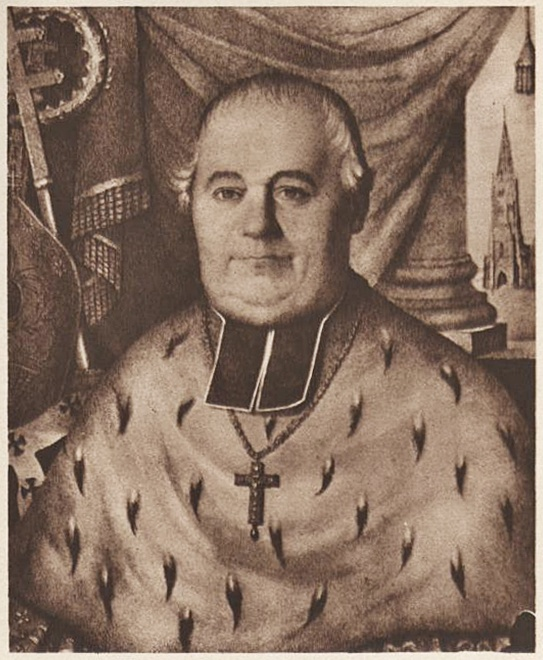
- Church: Catholic Church
- Archdiocese: Archdiocese of Freiburg
- In office: 21 November 1836 – 21 March 1842
- Predecessor: Bernhard Boll
- Successor: Hermann von Vicari

Orders
- Ordination: 10 August 1796
- Consecration: 29 January 1837 by Johann Baptist von Keller

Personal details
- Born: 1 August 1773 Free and Imperial City of Augsburg, Holy Roman Empire
- Died: 21 March 1842 (aged 68) Freiburg im Breisgau, Grand Duchy of Baden, German Confederation

Ignaz Anton Demeter (1 August 1773 – 21 March 1842) was a Roman Catholic priest, talented as a teacher and church musician, who served as the archbishop of Freiburg im Breisgau from 1836 till his death five years later.

== Life ==
=== Early years ===
Ignaz Anton Demeter was born at Augsburg in the summer of 1773. His parents, Johann Nepomuk Demeter and his wife Eleonore were master-bakers. Ignaz Anton was the eldest of approximately twelve children, although five of his siblings died before reaching their first birthdays. His father, Johann Nepomuk Demeter was originally from Höchstädt an der Donau, across the river and then in the Duchy of Palatinate-Neuburg. His mother was from Augsburg.

Even as a teenager Demeter composed some music. He played the violin, 'cello and, more unusually, a double reed wind instrument, the bassoon. In addition to his activities as an instrumentalist he sang as a chorister at the cathedral. Ignaz later moved on from Augsburg, but a friend and contemporary from his childhood, Anton Böhm, stayed and set up a music publishing business in the city, later dedicating a mass that he published to his childhood friend, Ignaz Demeter.

Ignaz Anton Demeter's attended the city school in Augsburg and the Benedictine Salvator Gymnasium (cathedral school). His love of music was complemented by a love of foreign languages, for which he won a school prize. He won the prize after praying for it to the Blessed Virgin Mary, and for the rest of his life he would remember that his prayer had been heard. In 1793, through a combination of perseverance and ability he won a place at the St. Bartholomew Institute (Bartholomäerinstitut) at Dillingen.

It was at Dillingen that he got to know the distinguished theologian Johann Michael Sailer, who also tutored him. Sailer's pietist revivalism (Erweckungsbewegung) influenced him deeply. Sailer's followers placed the gospels at the heart of their beliefs, but were nevertheless keen to avoid any form of sectarianism or separatism. Pure in heart and filled with good intentions, they nevertheless attracted persecution on various grounds, most of which had little to do with faith or belief.

It was Sailer who spotted Ignaz Demeter's talent for teaching. The local lord of the time and place, Baron Schenk von Stauffenberg, provided a stipendium which enabled him to study for the priesthood, and three years later, slightly more than a week after his twentieth birthday, Ignaz Anton Demeter was ordained into the priesthood on 10 August 1796. He celebrated his first mass in his home city of Augsburg.

=== First parishes ===
After this he worked as a curate in Ried, which was part of the ecclesiastical Jettingen district. Other incumbents in the district included Christoph von Schmid and Martin Boos. They, like Demeter, were admirers of Sailer, and followers of his ideas. However, the times were not yet ready for Sailer's ideas, which were still viewed with deep suspicion, especially in the more rural areas. Also during this period Demeter embarked upon which became a lengthy correspondence with the reformer Johannes Gossner, who was another alumnus of Dillingen. The correspondence testifies to Demeter's spiritual development and deep inner religiosity, although in the end their paths would diverge. Gossner became a Protestant in 1826.

On 11 February 1802, on the recommendation of his sponsor from his time at university, Baron Schenk von Stauffenberg, Demeter was presented the incumbency of Lautlingen and Margrethausen in the Swabian Jura. He moved into his new parish with his third sister, Maria Viktoria Josepha, who managed household matters for him. Lautlingen already had a school, but it operated only during the winter season because the agricultural economy of the place needed everyone working on the land through the summer. Demeter later wrote that he was the first one to introduce a structured curriculum to it. By imposing a structured approach and providing the teaching himself Demeter achieved remarkable improvements in the standard of education. On the musical front there had been a church choir of sorts since at least as far back as 1780, but Demeter's background at the Augsburg cathedral school and his intense musicality enabled him to transform the standard.

=== Rastatt ===
The transformations achieved in his village parish did not go unnoticed, and in 1808, at the instigation of Vicar General von Wessenburg, Demeter was transferred to the parish of Rastatt, where he was also made a deacon and director of the newly organised Teaching seminary, along with other education related duties. He also found time while in Rastatt to produce several school textbooks, though little trace of these remains due to the destructive chaos imposed by subsequent warfare.

=== Sasbach ===
On 29 October 1818, Demeter was moved to Sasbach. The transfer came at his own request, as a result of illness. At Sasbach he was appointed "Definitor" in 1819 and deacon in 1831. A rich body of material on the time he spent in Demeter survives in the archives. A defining theme was the enthusiastic expansion of church music across the region, for which he was also successful in obtaining funding. In 1826 he was appointed by the Grand Duke a councillor of the "Catholic Church section" of the Interior Ministry for Baden. The appointment required him to be based in Karlsruhe, and he stayed only a year before returning to his parish at Sasbach, but there is abundant evidence in the archives that his relations with the Grand Duke remained more than cordial up till the latter's death in 1830.

=== Freiburg ===
The Roman Catholic Archdiocese of Freiburg was created only 1821. The first archbishop, Bernhard Boll, summoned Demeter to join the Freiburg Cathedral chapter as a priest (Dompfarrer) in 1833. There followed almost immediately a foretaste of the political ructions within the chapter which would be a feature, at Freiburg, of the final nine years of Demeter's life. Demeter moved to Freiburg accompanied by his nephew, the scholar-priest Adolf Pfister, whose support he valued. There was immediate uproar in the chapter and the local church news sheet sharply criticised the nepotism involved and Demeter's "nephew household" (Vetternwirtschaft). Keen to avoid further difficulties for Demeter, Pfister left Freiburg, returning to live with his parents, and later securing an appointment as priest at Steinhofen (today subsumed into Bisingen).

As Minster priest (Münsterpfarrer) he lost no time in updating the liturgy, which in 1833 was embellished with large amounts of flowery and sugary syntax, of which he purged it. Demeter had no academic training as a liturgical scholar, but he was a natural musician and a committed pastor with his body and soul. Within a year this sixty year old rural outsider had completely reworked the cathedral liturgy. Unsurprisingly his changes encountered stiff opposition from some of his fellow cathedral clerics. Demeter fought his corner, and when he warned against clerical egotism (egoismus clericalis) he probably had a point.

Archbishop Boll died in March 1836. The cathedral chapter had several candidates in mind to succeed him including, notably, Hermann von Vicari. Ignaz Anton Demeter himself had no wish to put his own forward. However, with no consensus forming round any of the existing candidates, Demeter was urged to stand for election by the secular authorities who strongly and repeatedly endorsed his candidature through a succession of elections. Eventually, on 11 May 1836, Ignaz Anton Demeter received the overall majority of votes required and was elected archbishop of Freiburg.

For his motto Demeter chose the somewhat portentous assertion "This will be the hour that brings me closer to death" (Diese Stunde wird es sein, die mich dem Tode näher bringt). His incumbency as archbishop was characterised by strife.

Catholic Church titles
Preceded by Bernhard Boll	Archbishop of Freiburg; 1836–1842	Succeeded by Hermann von Vicari
