= Joseph Widmer =

Swiss Roman Catholic theologian

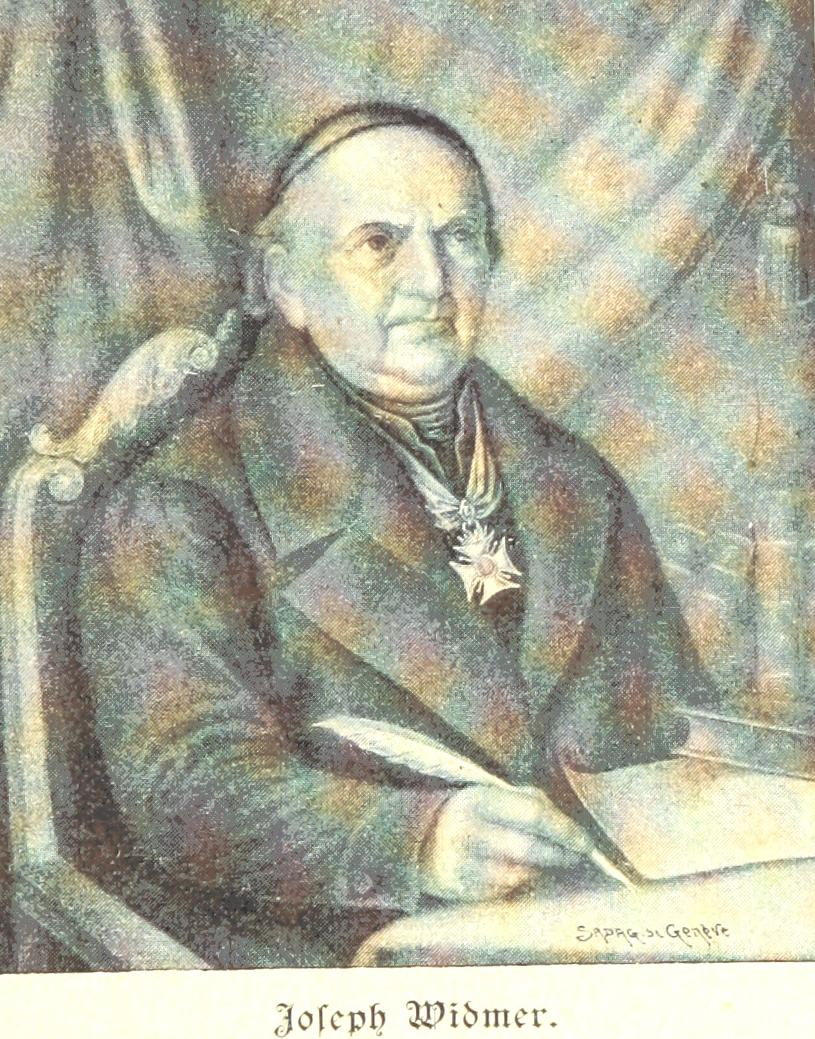
Joseph Widmer.

Joseph Widmer (15 August 1779 – 10 December 1844) was a Swiss Catholic theologian. A native of Hohenrain, he died in Beromünster.

== Biography ==
Widmer studied philosophy at Lucerne, and theology at Landshut (1802-4) under Johann Michael Sailer and Patrick Benedict Zimmer, the former exercising a great and abiding influence over him. After ordination, Widmer was appointed professor of philosophy in 1804, and of moral and pastoral theology in 1819 at the lyceum of Lucerne.

In 1833, Widmer was removed from his position by the government and received a Canonry in the collegiate chapter at Beromünster; in 1841 he became the provost of this chapter. In connection with Joseph Heinrich Aloysius Gügler, Widmer opposed the teachings of Ignaz Heinrich von Wessenberg, and contributed to a Swiss Catholic revival.

== Works ==
Among Widmer's writings are:

- Philosophische Aphorismen über die Metapphysik (Luzern, 1815)
- Der katholische Seelsorger (Munich, 1819–23)
- Systematische Uebersicht der in Sailer's Handbuch der christlichen Moral ausführlich entwickelten and dargestellten Grundsätze (Sarmenstorf, 1839)
- Vortrage uber Pastoraltheologie (Sarmenstorf, 1840)

He edited the works of Sailer (Sulzbach, 1830–46), of Franz Geiger (Fluelen, 1823–39), and Gügler (Lucerne, 1828–40).
