= Gugler (disambiguation) =

Gugler or Gügler refers to a 1375 force of mostly English and French knights.

Gugler may also refer to:

- Eric Gugler (1889–1974), American Neoclassical architect
- Joseph Heinrich Aloysius Gügler (1782–1827), Swiss theologian
- Christian Gugler (born 1960), Swiss athlete

== See also ==
- Googler
