= Hermann von Vicari =

German Catholic churchman

- Archbishop of Freiburg im Breisgau
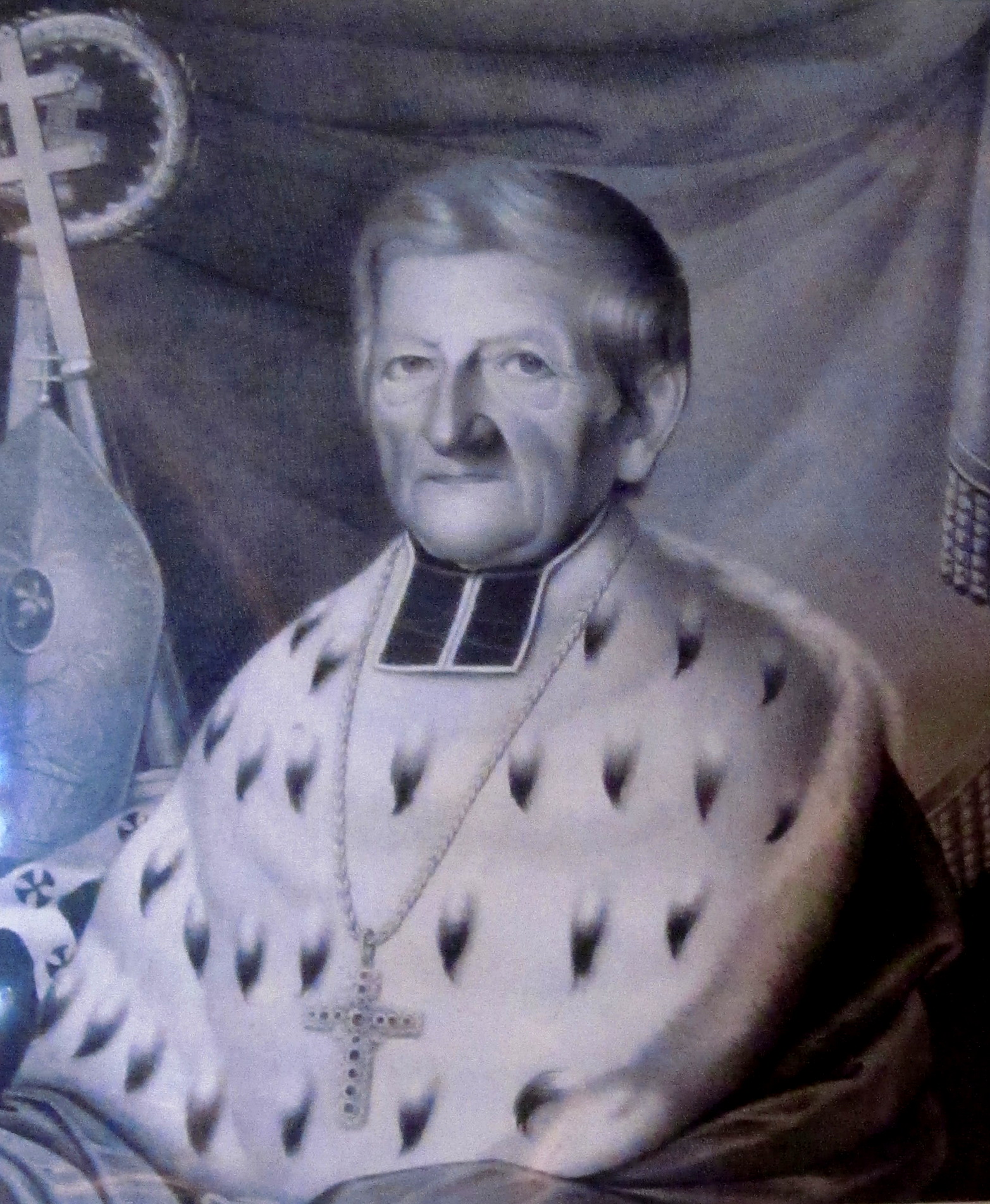
- Hermann von Vicari as Archbishop of Freiburg
- Church: Catholic Church
- Archdiocese: Archdiocese of Freiburg im Breisgau
- In office: 30 January 1843 – 14 April 1868
- Predecessor: Ignaz Anton Demeter
- Successor: Johann Baptist Orbin
- Previous post: Titular Bishop of Macri

Orders
- Ordination: 1 October 1797
- Consecration: 8 April 1832 by Bernhard Boll

Personal details
- Born: 31 May 1773 Aulendorf, Königsegg-Aulendorf, Swabian Circle, Holy Roman Empire
- Died: 14 April 1868 (aged 94) Freiburg im Breisgau, Grand Duchy of Baden
- Coat of arms

Hermann von Vicari (13 May 1773 at Aulendorf in Württemberg – 14 April 1868 at Freiburg) was a German Catholic churchman, who became Archbishop of Freiburg, in Baden.

== Life ==
In 1789, he received tonsure at Constance and obtained a canonry, studied law until 1795 at Vienna, and after a brief practice began the study of theology. In 1797 he was ordained priest, and made ecclesiastical councillor and official of the episcopal curia at Constance. After the suppression of the diocese (1802) the Archbishop of Freiburg appointed him cathedral canon, in 1827 vicar-general, and in 1830 cathedral dean.

In 1822 he was appointed Auxiliary Bishop of Macra, in 1836 and 1842 diocesan administrator, and in 1842 archbishop. As archbishop, Vicari endeavoured to release the Church of Baden from the bonds of Josephinism and the principles of Wessenberg, and to defend its rights against the civil government. To overcome prevalent religious indifference he emphasized the rights of bishops in training and appointing the clergy, and enforced discipline as regards mixed marriages. In a violent dispute with the Government over his prohibition of a Requiem Mass for deceased Protestant rulers he was victorious, as also in later contests about the schools.

He was energetic in his support of the secular authority, and in the revolutionary years of 1848-1849, he exhorted the Catholics to remain loyal.

Though placed under police supervision and held prisoner in his palace, he brought about the reorganization of Catholic life in Baden. He founded a seminary for boys out of his private means, established a theological house of studies, and appointed men of religious conviction as professors at the ecclesiastical seminary. In numerous pastoral letters and exercises, he animated the priests for their high calling, exhorted them to the fulfilment of their duties, and punished disobedience.

== Sources ==
- Kubel, Hermann von Vicari (Freiburg, 1869);
- Hansjacob, Hermann von Vicari (Würzburg, 1873).

Hermann von Vicari Born: 13 May 1773 in Aulendorf Died: 4 April 1868 in Freiburg im Breisgau
Catholic Church titles
Preceded by Ignaz Anton Demeter	Archbishop of Freiburg; 1842–1868	Succeeded by Lothar von Kübel as archdiocesan administrator
