= Bernhard Boll =

German Roman Catholic priest and monk

Bernhard Boll O. Cist.
- Archbishop of Freiburg im Breisgau
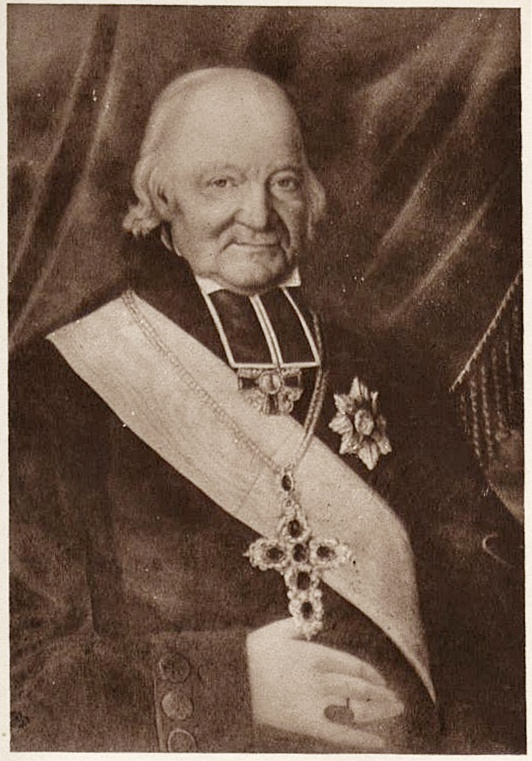
- Church: Catholic Church
- Archdiocese: Archdiocese of Freiburg im Breisgau
- In office: 21 May 1827 – 6 March 1836
- Predecessor: Archdiocese established
- Successor: Ignaz Anton Demeter

Orders
- Ordination: 23 September 1780
- Consecration: 21 October 1827 by Ferdinand August von Spiegel

Personal details
- Born: Johann Heinrich Boll; 7 June 1756 Stuttgart, Duchy of Württemberg, Swabian Circle, Holy Roman Empire
- Died: 6 March 1836 (aged 79) Freiburg im Breisgau, Grand Duchy of Baden, German Confederation

Bernhard Boll (7 June 1756 in Stuttgart – 6 March 1836 in Freiburg im Breisgau) was a German Roman Catholic priest, Cistercian monk and the first Archbishop of Freiburg.

== Life ==
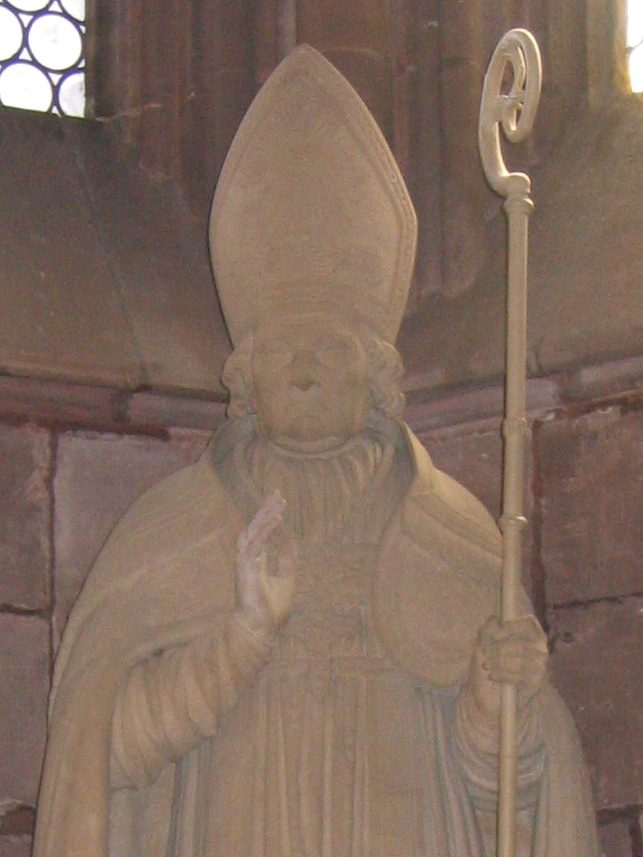
Sculpture of Bernhard Boll by André Friedrich, Freiburg Minster

Born Johann Heinrich Boll, he studied theology as a Jesuit novice in Rottweil from 1772 and then at the seminary in Dillingen an der Donau. He became a Cistercian monk at Salem Abbey in 1774, taking the name Bernhard. He was assessed as intelligent but angry and arrogant and so his probation was extended by a year, meaning he only took his perpetual vows on 13 November 1776.

He quickly developed into a devout monk and scholar and was ordained priest in 1780, later becoming professor of philosophy at Salem and at Tennenbach Abbey. In 1805 he became professor of philosophy at the University of Freiburg and in 1809 a canon at Freiburg Minster. Secularization and mediatization meant that Germany's dioceses and archdioceses also had to be reorganized. One of the archdioceses formed as a result was that of Freiburg, formed by merging the Diocese of Constance with parts of the Mainz, Straßburg, Worms and Würzburg dioceses. It was set up by pope Pius VII in the papal bull "Provida solersque" of 16 August 1821. The territory of the new archdiocese of Freiburg was mostly in the Grand Duchy of Baden (established in 1806) and difficulties arose finding a candidate for its archbishop who would be acceptable to both the pope and to Louis I, Grand Duke of Baden. Pope Leo XII suggested Boll as a compromise candidate in 1824 after Ignaz Heinrich von Wessenberg was rejected and the second choice Ferdinand Geminian Wanker died during the negotiations. Boll was consecrated as archbishop by Ferdinand August von Spiegel, archbishop of Cologne on 21 October 1827.

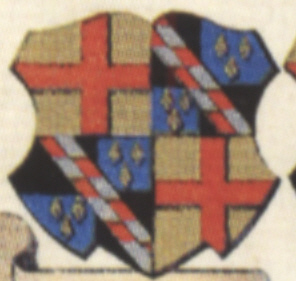
Boll's coat of arms as bishop

Boll was already 71 and suffering form old age and illness, meaning his term of office was an unsuccessful one. The Grand Duchy retained the nomination of almost all bishops in its lands and held that state power was superior to that of the church in almost every respect, leaving Boll little leeway. He had to set up an administrative structure for the archdiocese from scratch, since only Hermann von Vicari was transferred to him from the former church administrations in Konstanz and Bruchsal. His cathedral chapter could not reach consensus and so had less influence on the archdiocese's spiritual and liturgical life than traditions left over from its predecessor bishoprics - for example, what had been the diocese of Konstanz was still more marked by the Age of Enlightenment whereas the northern parts of the archdiocese were more traditionalist. Boll became increasingly aware that the work was beyond his abilities and offered the pope his resignation, but he died on 6 March 1836 before the pope could decide whether to accept it.

== Bibliography ==
- (in German) Friedrich von Weech (1876). "Boll, Bernhard" . Allgemeine Deutsche Biographie (in German). Vol. 3. Leipzig: Duncker & Humblot. p. 108.
- (in German) Christoph Schmider: Die Freiburger Bischöfe: 175 Jahre Erzbistum Freiburg. Eine Geschichte in Lebensbildern. Freiburg i. Br.: Herder Verlag, 2002. ISBN 3-451-27847-2.

Catholic Church titles
New title	Archbishop of Freiburg; 1827–1836	Succeeded by Ignaz Anton Demeter
