= Leuce =

Leuce may refer to:

- Leuce (mythology), in Greek mythology, a nymph, daughter of Oceanus
- Leuce (island), the Greek name of an island of the Black Sea
- Leuce (titular see), a Roman Catholic titular see in Thrace
- Populus sect. Leuce, an old name for the white poplar trees and aspens, see Populus section Populus
