= Hans Baur (sculptor) =

German sculptor

- Born: 26 February 1829; Konstanz, Grand Duchy of Baden
- Died: 5 June 1897; Konstanz, Grand Duchy of Baden, Germany
- Occupation: Sculptor
- Spouse: Albertine Robert (1842-1926)
- Children: Laura Baur/Weighardt
- Parent: Johann Baur (1789-1837)

Hans Baur (26 February 1829 – 5 June 1897) was a German sculptor.

== Life ==
Hans Baur was born in Konstanz. His father, Johann Baur (1789–1837), was also a sculptor, originally from Thurgau, across the lake in Switzerland. The son completed his schooling in 1846 and went on to become a pupil of Johann Jakob Oechslin in Schaffhausen. Oechslin evidently recognised Baur's talent, but there was also a personal connection, in that Oechslin's second wife, Adelheid, was Hans Baur's half-sister. Oechslin was able to direct Baur towards the increasingly fashionable classical style.

With a financial bursary from the Grand Duke, Baur was able to study between 1851 and 1855 at the Munich Academy of Fine Arts, where he was taught by Max von Widnmann. He returned to Konstanz in 1855. Here he immediately received the commission for the two life-sized figures of Saints Conrad and Pelagius positioned above the west door of the Minster, which underwent an extensive restoration between 1844 and 1860. That year he also produced a statuette of Jan Hus.

Between 1857 and 1861, Hans Baur worked at the newly established Fine Arts Academy ("Kunstschule") in Karlsruhe. He was able to rent a private studio in the academy's new building in the Bismarckstraße. Students whom he taught here included Friedrich Moest and Gustav von Kreß.

In 1862, having left the Fine Arts Academy, he moved back to Konstanz where he married Albertine Robert (1842-1926). Based in Konstanz, he would be able to pursue his career as a sculptor from now on. There was an interlude during 1863/65, however, during which he undertook an extended study tour to Paris and Rome. Two life-sized marble figures which he produced for the Villa Weschsler in Ulm on his return show clear signs of his study of Italian sculpture. In Konstanz he taught the young Joseph Franz Baumeister between 1873 and 1877.

The celebratory unveiling of his final work took place on 30 October 1897, nearly five months after his death. The imposing "Kaiserbrunnen" (loosely "Emperors fountain") in the Market Square in Konstanz features a niche on each of its four sides. Each contains a life-sized statue of an emperor: Henry III, Barbarossa, Maximilian I and Wilhelm I. The political message lacked subtlety: the recently deceased Hohenzollern Emperor of the united Germany could be ranked with three of the most celebrated Holy Roman Emperors of the second millennium.
