= André Friedrich =

French sculptor

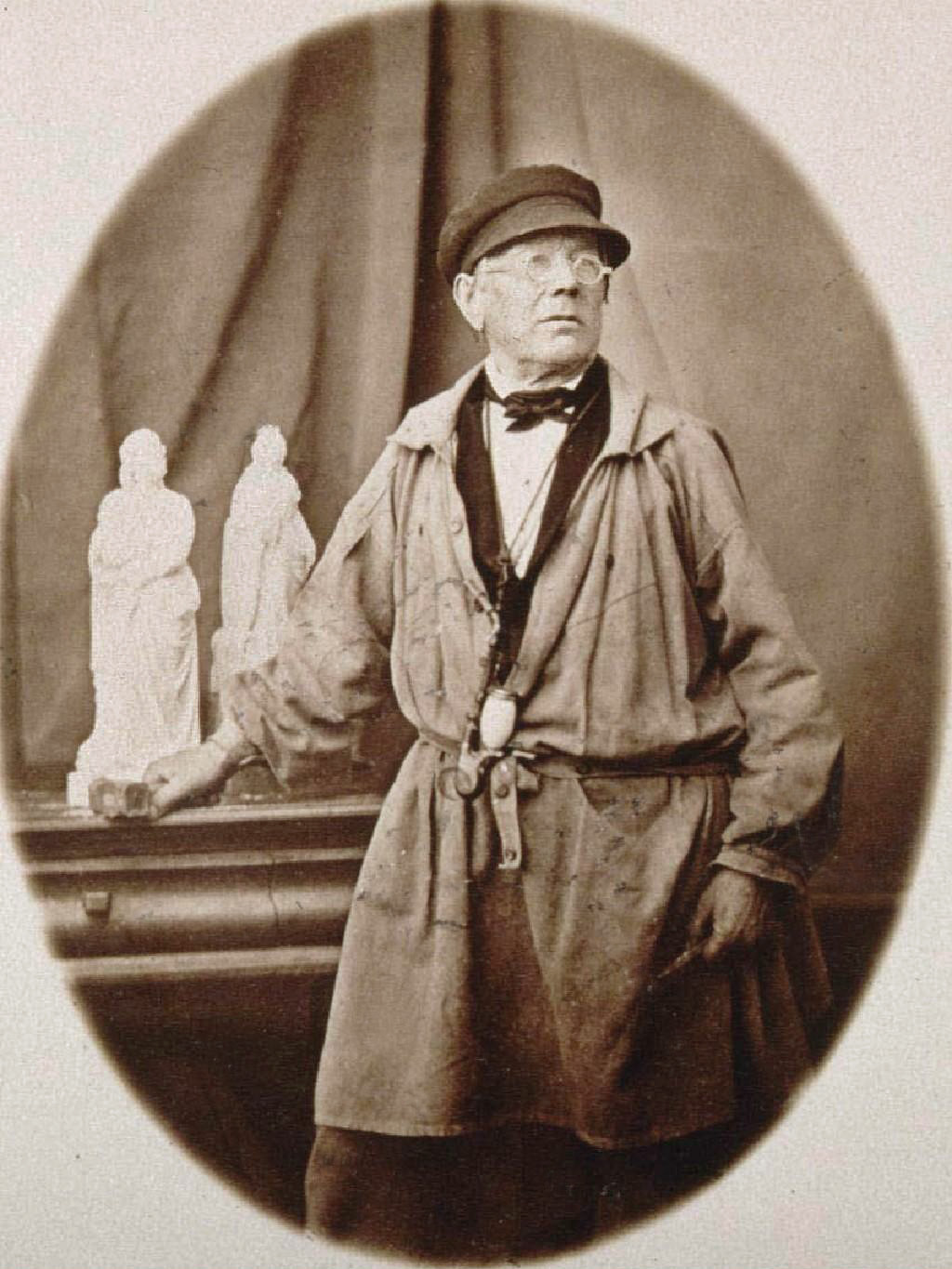
André Friedrich (1860)

André Friedrich or Andreas Friederich (17 January 1798, in Ribeauvillé – 9 March 1877, in Strasbourg) was an Alsatian artist, sculptor and lithographer active in Germany and France.

== Life ==
He studied at the Kunstakademie in Dresden and in 1819 (aged 21) he entered the Berlin studio of Johann Gottfried Schadow. He moved to Paris in 1821, where he studied under François Joseph Bosio, and spent two years in Rome, where in 1824 he studied under Bertel Thorvaldsen. In 1826 he settled in Strasbourg.

== Selected sculptures ==
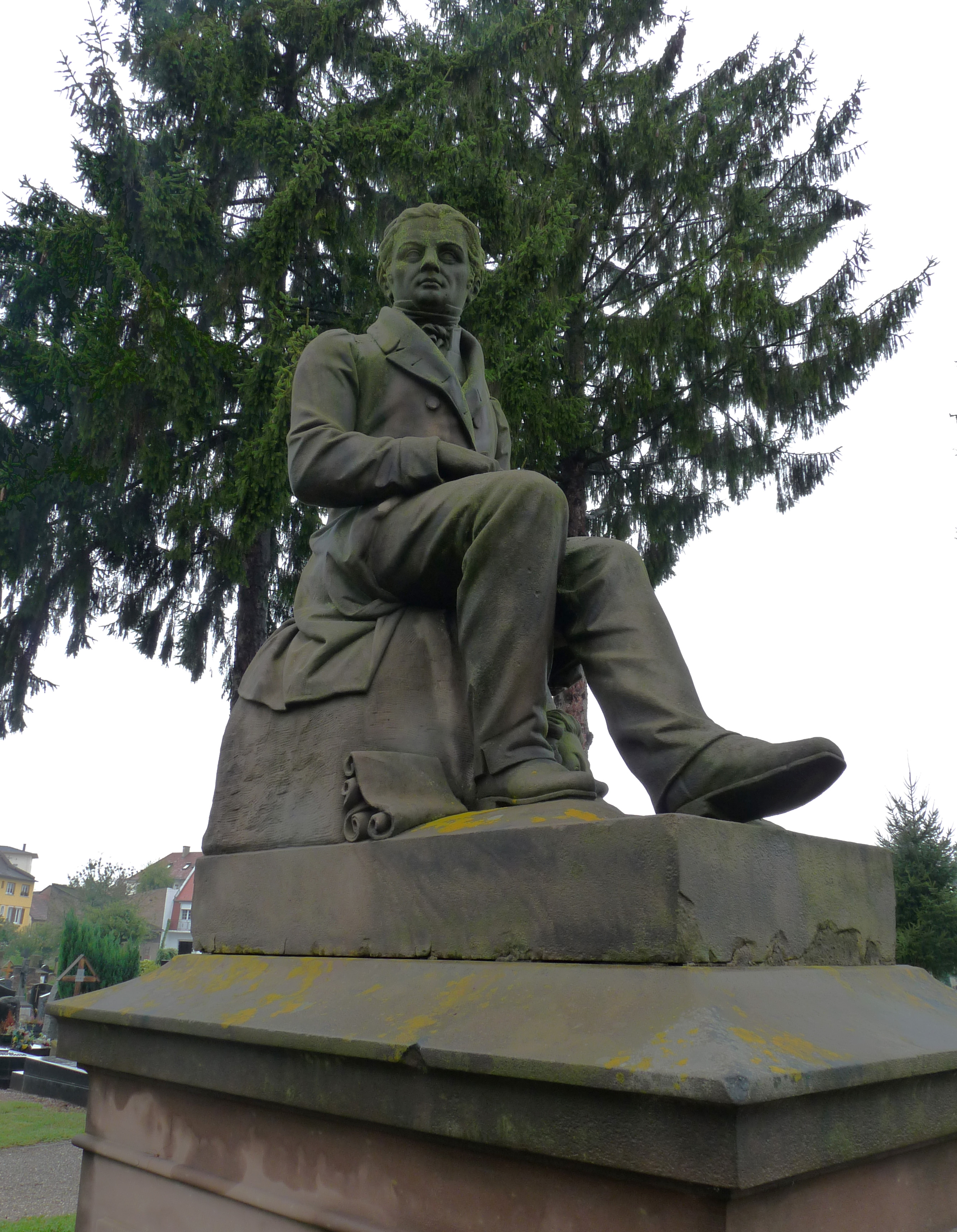
Memorial to Johann-Georg-Daniel Arnold, Strasbourg

- Memorial to Henri de La Tour d’Auvergne, Sasbach
- Portrait of Bernhard Boll, Freiburg Minster
- Portrait of Werner I, Strasbourg Cathedral
- Monument to Erwin von Steinbach, Steinbach district, Baden-Baden
- Statue of Francis Drake, Offenburg
- Portrait of Martin von Dunin, Poznań Cathedral
- 'Leopoldsdenkmal' monument, Achern, marking the geographical centre of Baden
- Figure of Christ, granite, Oberachern district cemetery (now part of the war memorial), Achern
- Portrait of the poet Gottlieb Konrad Pfeffel, Colmar
- Memorial to Johannes Hültz, designer of the north spire of Strasbourg Cathedral
- Memorial to Jacob Sturm von Sturmeck, founder of the Strasbourg Gymnasium

== Bibliography ==
- Allgemeines Künstlerlexikon. Band 45, 2005, S. 143–144.
- Ludwig Spach (1878). "Friedrich, Andreas" . Allgemeine Deutsche Biographie (in German). Vol. 8. Leipzig: Duncker & Humblot. p. 64.
