= Karl Kübel Foundation for Children and Families =

The Karl Kübel Stiftung für Kind und Familie is a German foundation that implements and promotes projects for children and families in Germany, Kosovo, India and other nations in Asia and Africa.

The foundation was established in 1972 by the entrepreneur Karl Kübel, who contributed the proceeds from the sale of his 3K-Möbelwerke company in 1973 and the majority of his personal assets to the foundation. In addition to the income generated by the foundation’s assets, external funding and donations form the financial basis for the foundation’s work. The foundation also receives third-party funding and donations. It is headquartered in Bensheim, Germany.

== Outline ==
The non-profit commitment of the Foundation is divided into three areas: domestic work, education and development cooperation.

The Department Inland and Communication initiates and supports sustainable projects for holistic education in the social area - GaBi. Its goal is to sensitize politics, business, and society to the needs of diverse families and to shape a family-friendly environment in conjunction with partners. Their commitment is, among other things, the model development of child and family centers and the establishment of participatory structures.

In Germany, the foundation runs currently one educational institute: The Odenwald Institute in Hessian Forest-Michelbach with conference rooms on the Tromm. The institute provide courses and activities on personality development, leadership, personal and professional development and strengthening family life. From 1995 to the end of 2023, the Karl Kübel Foundation also maintained the Felsenweg Institute in Dresden and, from 1995 to 2018, the Osterberg Institute in Niederkleveez, Schleswig-Holstein.

In India, the Karl Kübel Institute for Development Education was opened in Coimbatore, Tamil Nadu in 1999 to train the employees of the partner organizations.

The Foundation's development cooperation activities are centered around projects in India, the Philippines, Kosovo, Ethiopia and Nepal, as well as development policy education in Germany.

== Projects ==
In Germany, behind the title "GaBi - Holistic Education in the Social Space", projects such as "Drop In (inclusive)" and the development of family-friendly neighborhoods, and Early Excellence. The foundation cooperates with many federal states, counties, municipalities and cities. Significant co-operation exists with Hesse, Saxony, Thuringia and Berlin. Numerous local projects include drop in (inclusive), literacy - learning with real - life, discussions on the topics of work with children from disadvantaged families, inclusion and opportunities in early childhood education.

The Foundation organizes large-scale events, such as the Hessian Family Day, which is held every two years together with the Hessian Ministry for Social Affairs and Integration and in cooperation with the host city, with an average of 30,000 visitors. The Karl Kübel Foundation has been running the Hessen Foundation since 2004.

In the areas of development co-operation, the main objectives are the improvement of the living conditions of particularly in needy population groups on the ground and the sharpening of the consciousness for global responsibility in Germany. The foundation participates in the "weltwärts-Programm" of the German Federal Government and sends young volunteers to their projects in India and the Philippines.

== Karl Kübel Prize ==
Since 1990 - with a ten-year interruption - the Karl Kübel Foundation has awarded the Karl Kübel Prize, which has been promoted nationwide.
