= Johannes Hültz =

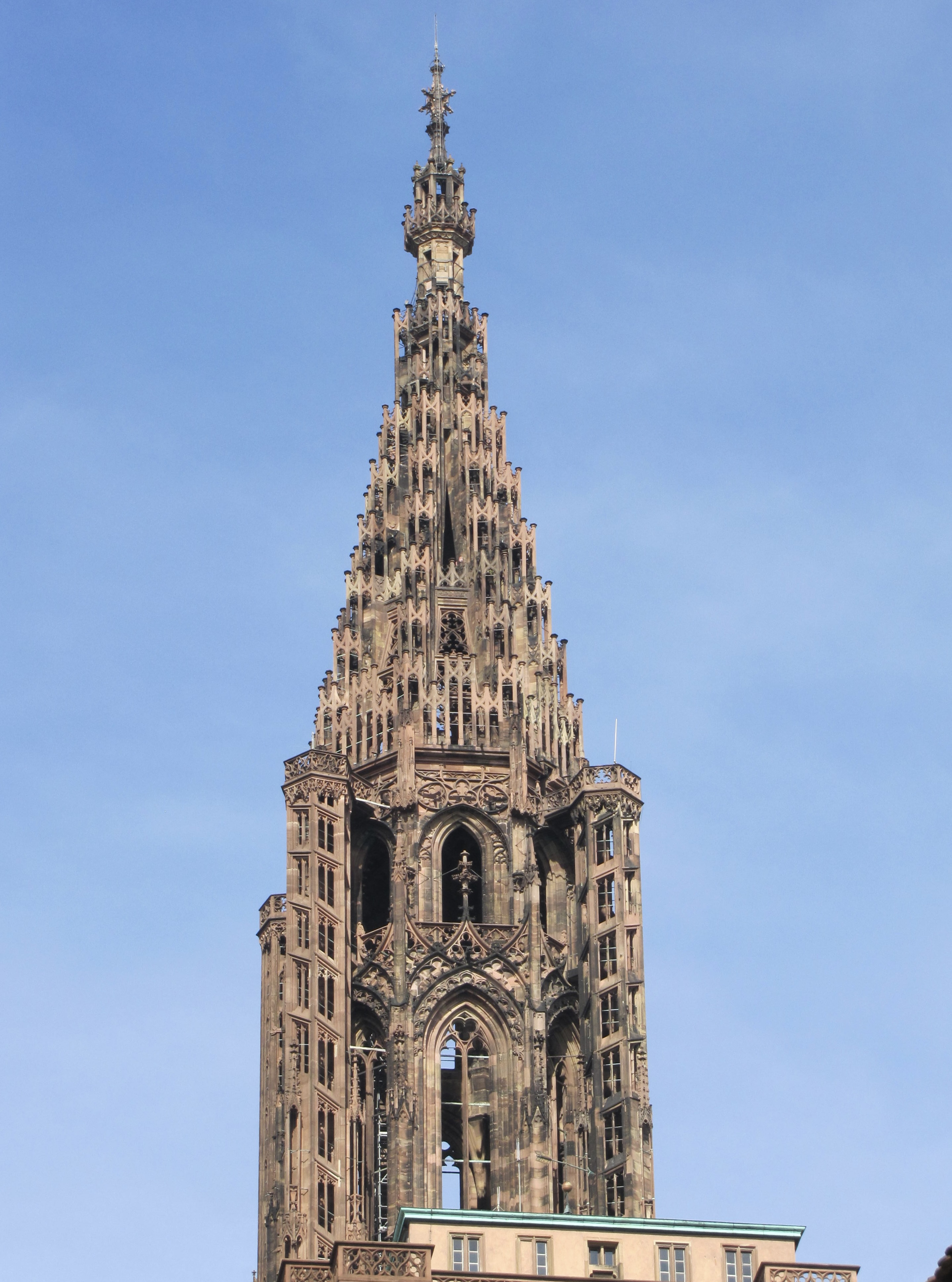
The spire in Strasbourg

Johannes Hültz (c 1390, Cologne - 1449, Strasbourg) was a German master builder of the Gothic period.

Believed to have been apprenticed to the Parler family, he succeeded Ulrich von Ensingen as city architect of Strasbourg on the latter's death in 1419. He also designed the spire on the north tower of Strasbourg Cathedral. A city and square are named after him in his birthplace, whilst Strasbourg has an 1846-1847 memorial to him by André Friedrich.
