= Joseph Heinrich Gügler =

Swiss theologian (1782–1827)

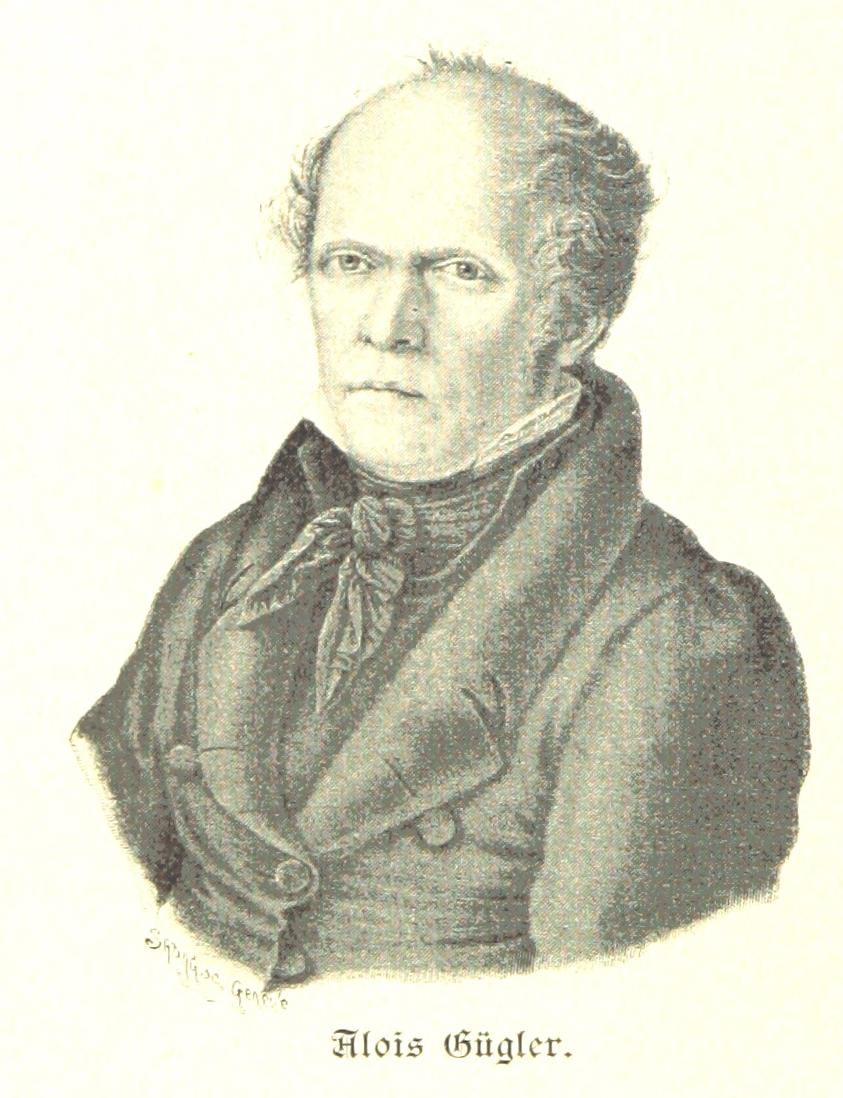
Aloysius Gügler.

Joseph Heinrich Aloysius Gügler (25 August 1782 – 28 February 1827) was a Swiss priest, professor, and theologian.

== Biography ==
Gügler was born on August 25, 1782, at the village of Udligerschwyl near Lucerne, Switzerland. He was the only son of simple country couple, and was recorded to be a delicate child.

He received no regular schooling, but loves to read the books of his father again and again, so much that when he was only twelve years old, he had read the entire Holy Bible several times. Religiously inclined from childhood, he early desired to enter the clerical state, and after many entreaties his parents permitted him to begin his studies at the abbey school of Einsiedeln. On December 31, 1798, Gügler was sent to Petershausen, near Constance. And in 1800 he continued his classical course at Solothurn. In 1801 he began his study in philosophy, which he finished with great credit at Lucerne according to Immanuel Kant.

During this period as a student, he became acquainted with Joseph Widmer, a fellow-student, the acquaintance ripening into a lifelong friendship. Through the influence of Widmer, Gügler, who had become undecided as to his future career, took up the study of theology, which both pursued at Landshut.

Shortly before Gügler's ordination to priesthood he was appointed professor of exegesis at the lyceum in Lucerne. On 9 March 1805, he was ordained as a priest by Testa Ferrata, the papal legate, in which he was made canon of the collegiate church of St. Leodegar (Saint-Léger), retaining his position as professor of exegesis. Later he also taught pastoral theology, and 1822-24 acted as prefect of the lyceum.

== Criticism ==
The methods of the new professors on how they taught students brought them into conflict, as well with the supporters of the old school, as with the followers of Ignaz Heinrich von Wessenberg and the "Illuminati" of Switzerland, they accused them of unchristian mysticism. A controversy followed between Gügler and Thaddæus Müller, city pastor of Lucerne, during which appeared, among other writings, Gügler's "Geist des Christentums und der Literatur im Verhältniss zu den Thaddæus Müllerschen Schriften". In December 12, 1820, Müller made a formal decree to the municipal authorities for the removal of Gügler from the professorship. Immediately Widmer handed in his resignation, although when majority of the students sided with Gügler. Müller saw his mistake, and, at his special request Gügler was reinstated on January 23, 1811.

Gügler had also a dispute with Marcus Lutz, pastor at Leufelfingen, and issued the sarcastic pamphlet "Chemische Analyse und Synthese des Marcus Lutz zu Leufelfingen" (1816). Another controversy was with Troxler, who later became known as a philosopher.

== Works ==
His principal work is: Die hl. Kunst oder die Kunst der Hebräer 1814, 1817, 1818 (3 volumes) It is about a philosophical exposition of Old Testament Revelation undertaken by a mind which gives full credence to the truth of Revelation.

In 1819 Widmer published the continuation of this work in relation to the New Testament: Ziffern der Sphinx oder Typen der Zeit und ihr Deuten auf die Zukunft (Solothurn, 1819). This was written to show the divine order of current events which are presented in grand pictures and prophetic visions. A periodical founded by Gügler in 1823, Zeichen der Zeit im Guten und Bösen, was continued by Philipp Segesser. Among Gügler's published works is a volume entitled Privatvorträge, lectures on the Gospel of St. John, the Epistle to the Hebrews, and the Christian doctrine of St. Augustine, together with a brief sketch of the sacred books of the Old Testament (Sarmenstorf, 1842). His posthumous works were edited by Widmer between 1828 and 1842. A complete list of all his printed works is given in the Thesaurus librorum rei catholicæ (Würzburg, 1856), I, 337.

Perhaps the last literary work of Gügler was a protest against the admission of non-Catholics to the Canton of Lucerne, as he wished to preserve for the people the inestimable boon of unity in faith. He died at Lucerne. His career, though short, was a source of great blessing to his country. Sketches of his life were written by Widmer and Geiger, and his biography was prepared by Joseph L. Schiffmann, Lebensgeschichte des Chorherrn und Professors Aloys Gügler (Augsburg, 1833); a lengthy article on Gügler and his exegetical works appeared in the Katholik (1829), XXXIV, 53, 196.
