= Lothar von Kübel =

- Apostolic Administrator of Freiburg im Breisgau
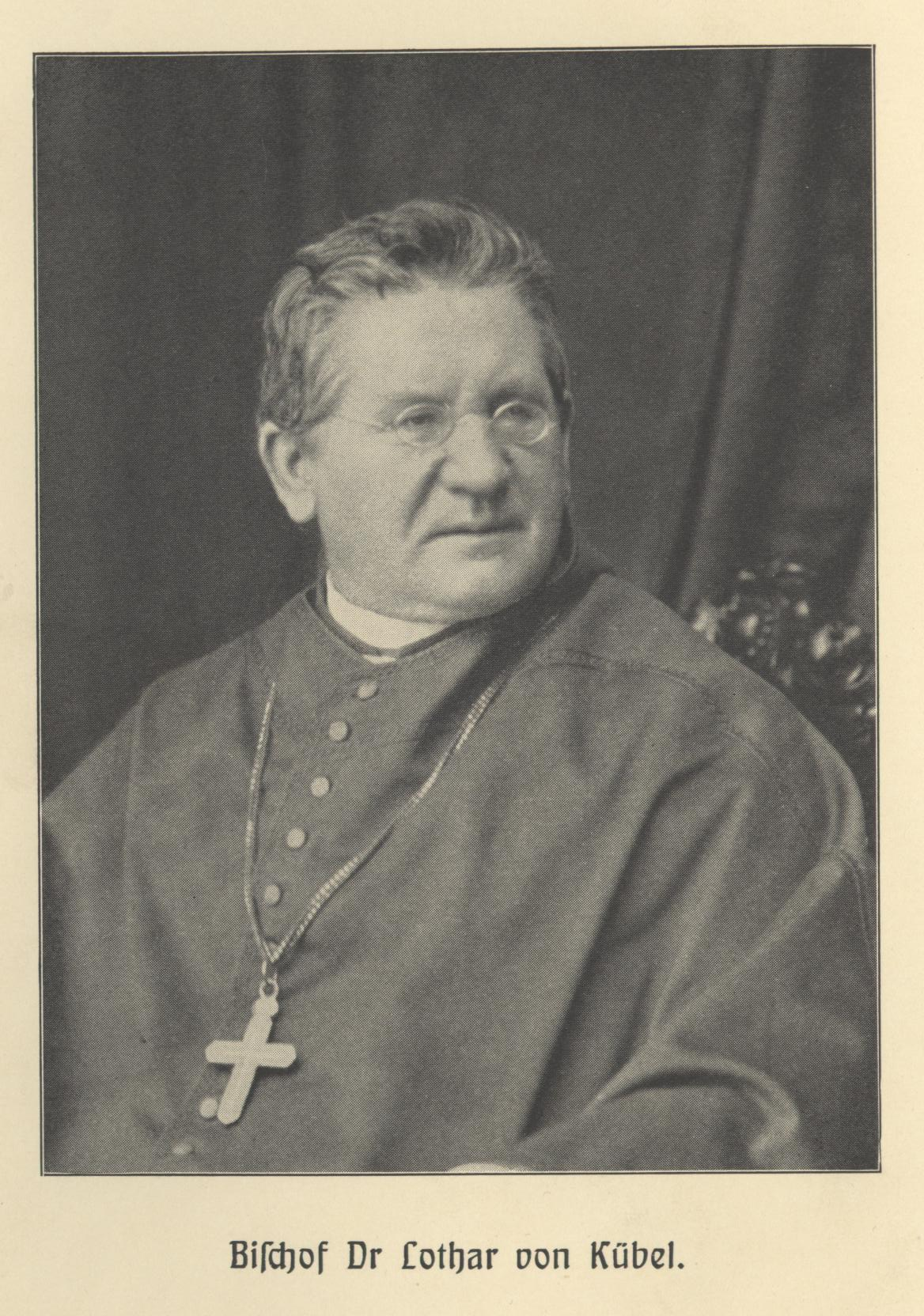
- Church: Catholic Church
- Archdiocese: Archdiocese of Freiburg im Breisgau
- In office: 5 January 1869 – 3 August 1881
- Other post: Titular Bishop of Leuce (1867-1881)
- Previous post: Auxiliary Bishop of Freiburg im Breisgau (1867-1869)

Orders
- Ordination: 19 August 1847
- Consecration: 22 March 1868 by Wilhelm Emmanuel von Ketteler

Personal details
- Born: 22 April 1823 Sinzheim, Grand Duchy of Baden, German Confederation
- Died: 3 August 1881 (aged 58) Sankt Peter, Grand Duchy of Baden, German Empire
- Coat of arms

Lothar Kübel or (from 1870) von Kübel (22 April 1823 in Sinzheim – 3 August 1881 in Sankt Peter, Baden-Württemberg) was a German Roman Catholic clergyman, who acted as auxiliary bishop and Apostolic Administrator in the Roman Catholic Archdiocese of Freiburg. A street in his birthplace as well as the town's Realschule and Hauptschule are all named after him.

== Life ==
=== Early life ===
The youngest of six children, he came from a family of builders but as a gifted pupil he was allowed to visit the Gymnasium in Rastatt. From 1843 onwards he studied theology in Freiburg and Munich and on 17 August 1847 Freiburg's archbishop Hermann von Vicari ordained him to the priesthood. He became a vicar in Donaueschingen, Bonndorf and Freiburg before in December 1848 becoming a 'repetitor' in Freiburg's theological college. In 1854 he joined an episcopal ordinariate overseeing educational issues, which had become one of the Church's points of conflict with the government of the Grand Duchy of Baden in Karlsruhe. When the Grand-ducal Theological College was converted into an archepiscopal 'Konvikt', he became its director.

=== Apostolic administrator ===
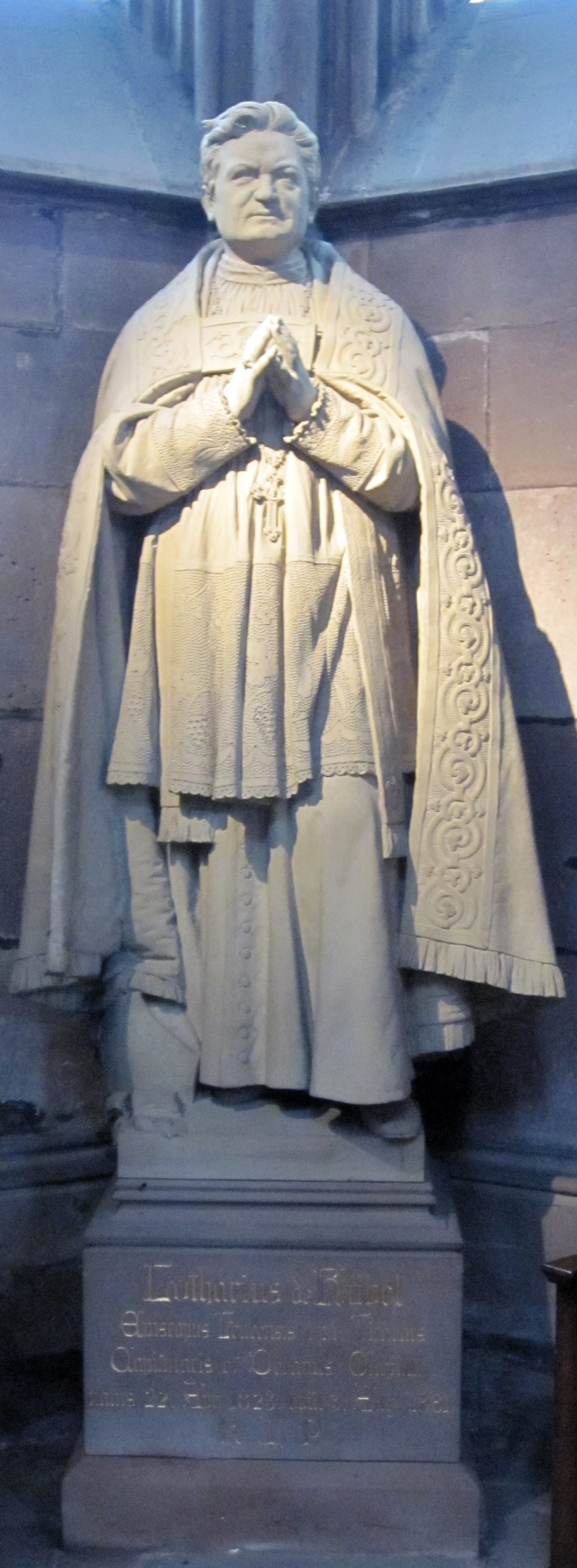
Statue of Kübel by Joseph Franz Baumeister in Freiburg Minster.

Kübel became Freiburg's cathedral dean and vicar general on 20 Novembner 1867 and on 22 March the following year he was consecrated an auxiliary bishop and titular bishop of Leuce by Wilhelm Emmanuel von Ketteler, bishop of Mainz. After von Vicari's death on 14 April 1868 the cathedral chapter elected Kübel the archdiocesan administrator. However, the church and the secular government of the Grand Duchy could not agree on a new bishop, so Kübel remained in post until his death, essentially continuing the church-state policies of von Vicari.

=== Kulturkampf ===
The Grand Duchy's support for the idea of a sovereign state church and the separation of church and state led to a continuing conflict with von Vicari and Kübel, particularly marked during Julius Jolly's time as Interior Minister from 1866 to 1876. This meant that Baden's 'Kulturkampf' was a forerunner of that in Prussia. Some key issues involved were removing elementary schools from church control, introducing compulsory state exams for theology students, registering births, marriages and deaths in church-run registry offices, making state law superior to church law (a measure completed on 1 February 1870), closing church-run societies, charities and hospitals and only allowing religious charities which were exclusively religious in their purpose.

== Bibliography ==
- Josef Becker (1982). "Kübel, Lothar von". Neue Deutsche Biographie (in German). Vol. 13. Berlin: Duncker & Humblot. pp. 172–173. (full text online).
- Heinrich Reusch (1883). "Kübel, Lothar von" . Allgemeine Deutsche Biographie (in German). Vol. 17. Leipzig: Duncker & Humblot. pp. 283–284.
- Karl Josef Rivinius (1992). "Kübel, Lothar von". In Bautz, Traugott (ed.). Biographisch-Bibliographisches Kirchenlexikon (BBKL) (in German). Vol. 4. Herzberg: Bautz. cols. 732–737. ISBN 3-88309-038-7.
- Dr. Joseph Schofer: "Bischof Lothar von Kübel", Herder Verlag, Freiburg, 1911

Catholic Church titles
Preceded by Hermann von Vicari as archbishop	Apostolic administrator of the Archdiocese of Freiburg; 1868–1881	Succeeded by Johann Baptist Orbin as archbishop
