= Tromm (Odenwald) =

Mountain in Germany

Coordinates: 49°36′16″N 8°48′10″E

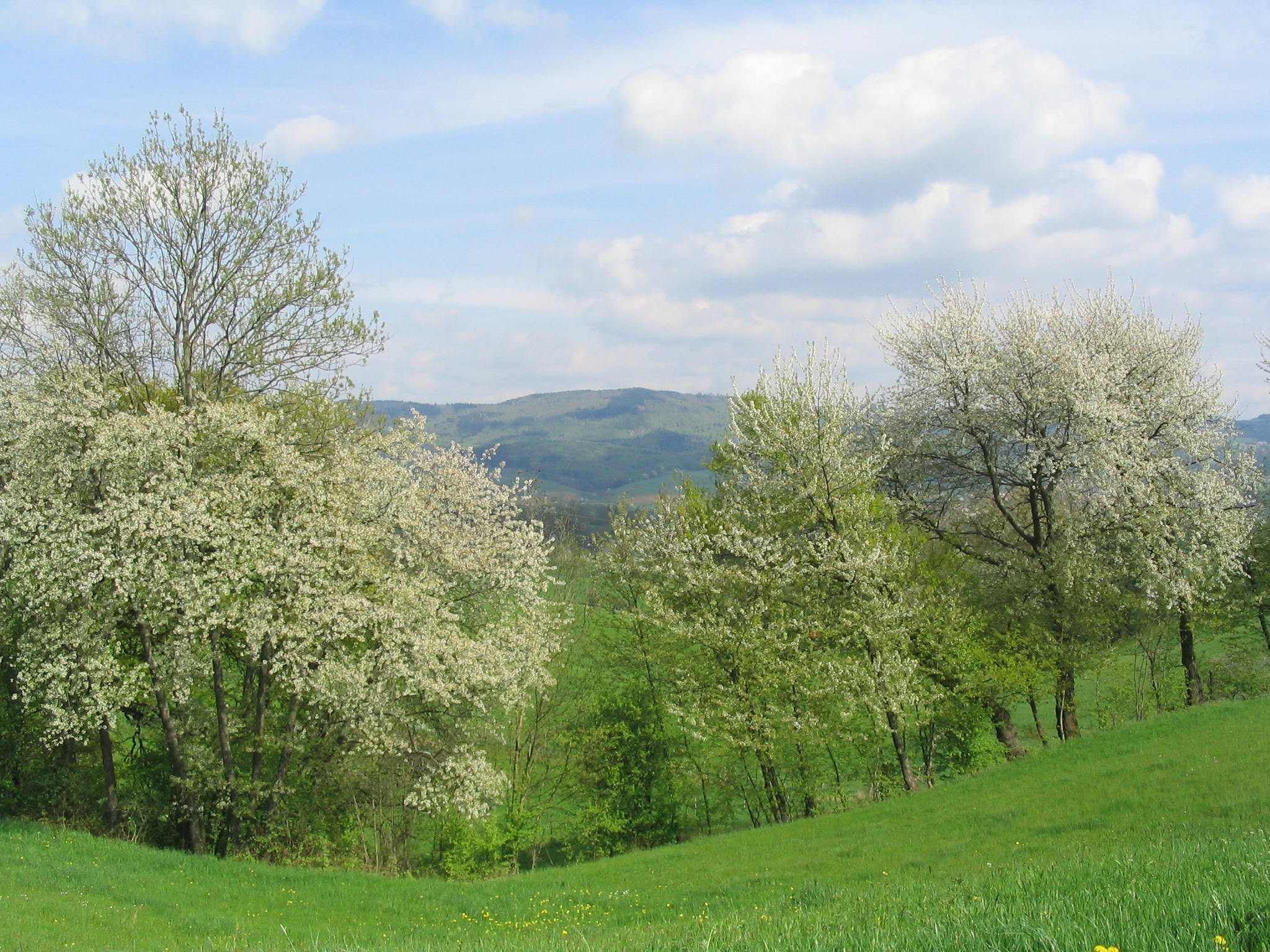
- Tromm mountain range from Weschnitztal.

Highest point
- Elevation: 577 m (1,893 ft)

Geography
- Location: Hesse, Germany

Tromm is an Odenwald mountain in Hesse, Germany.

== Gallery ==
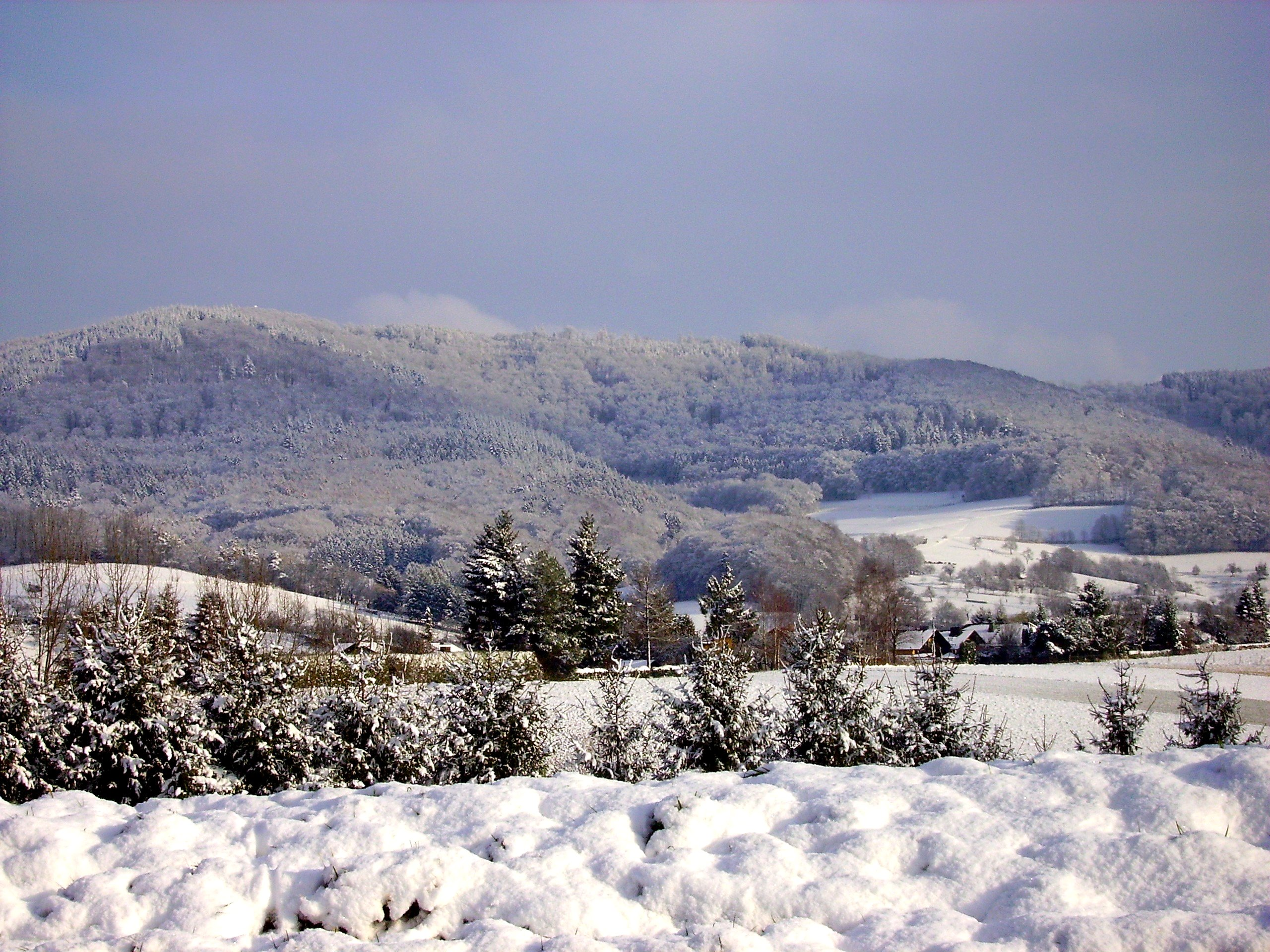
Tromm, 2010.

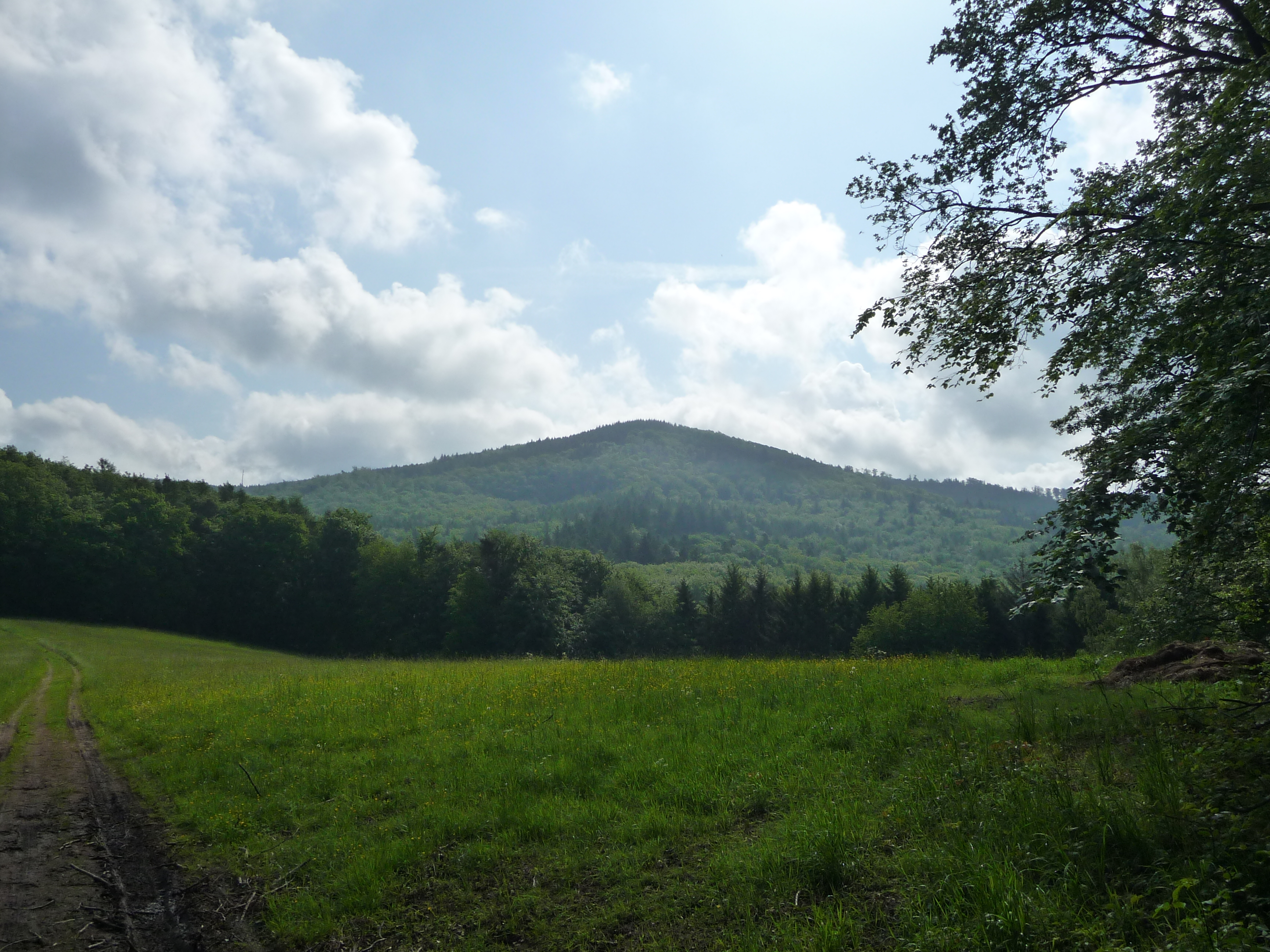
Tromm, 2012.

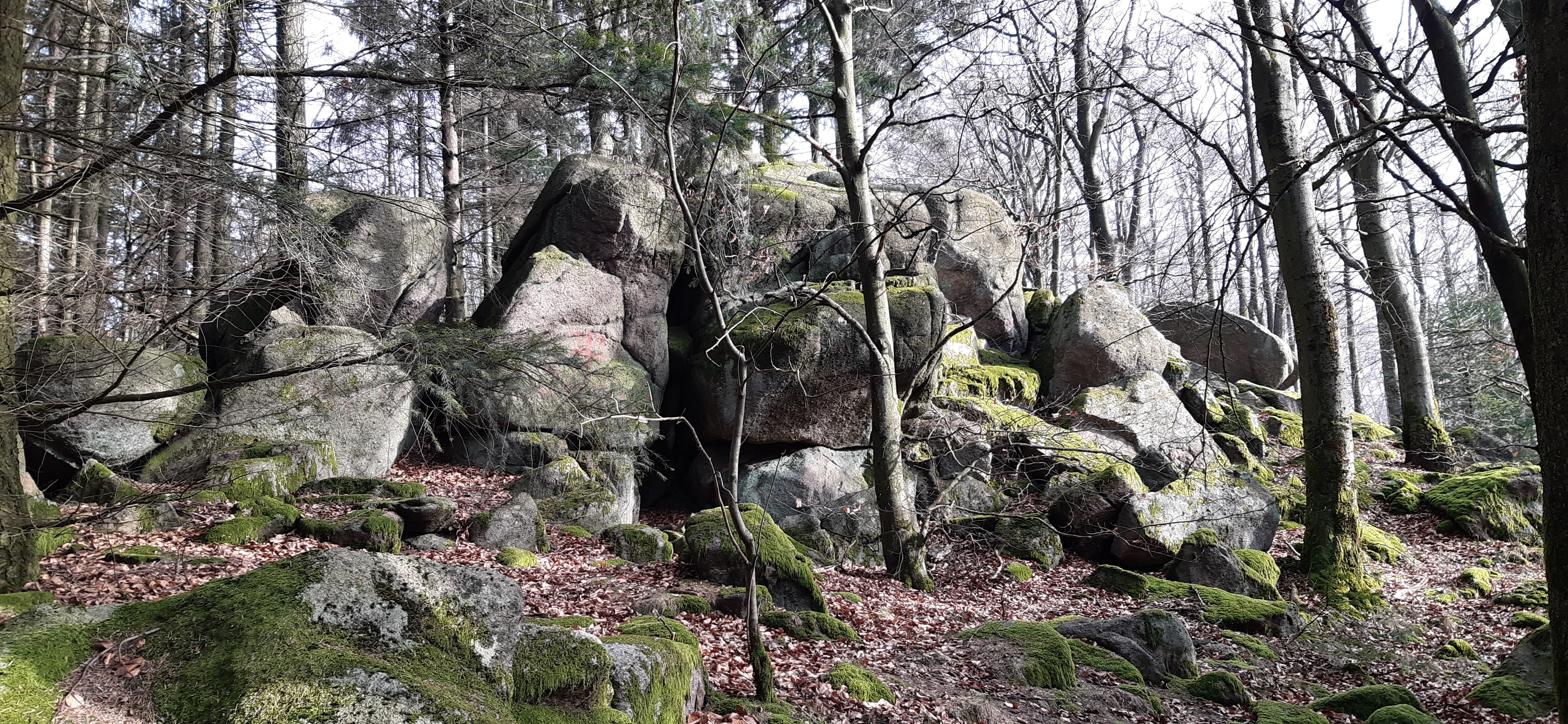
Rocks, 2020.

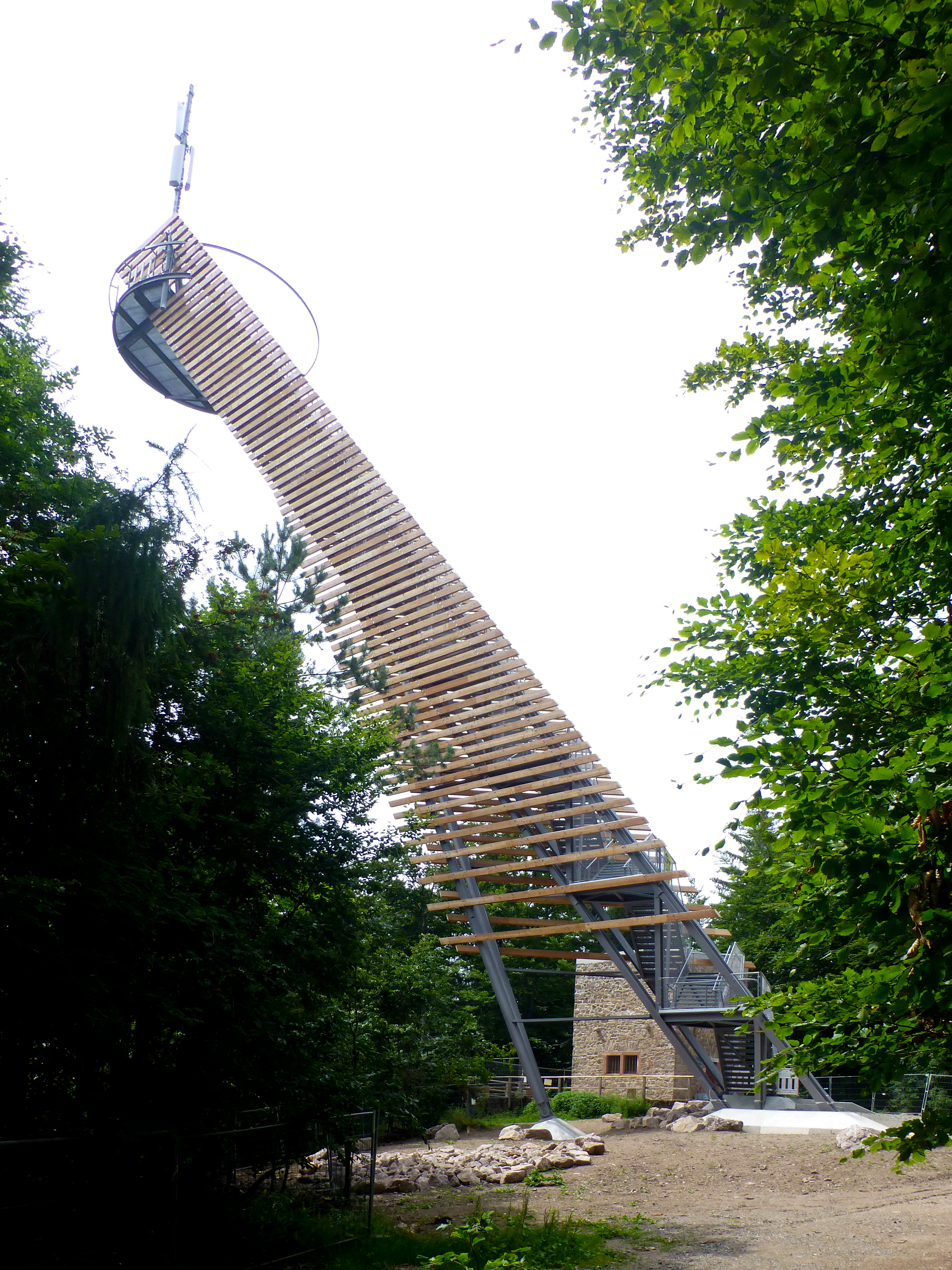
Tower, 2022.
