= Ferdinand Geminian Wanker =

German theologian

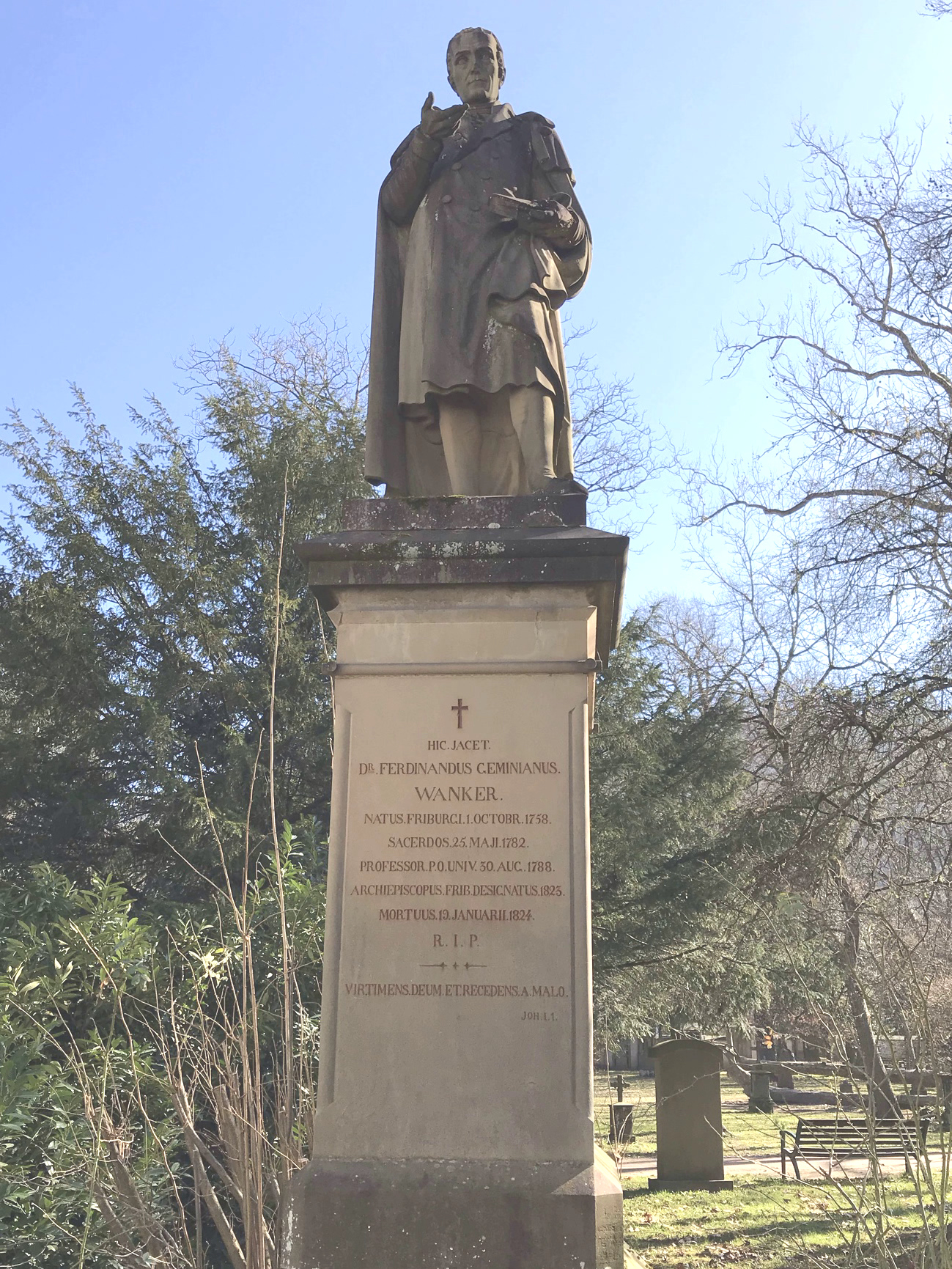
Grabmal im Alten Friedhof

Ferdinand Geminian Wanker (2 October 1758, Freiburg im Breisgau - 19 January 1824, Freiburg im Breisgau) was a German Roman Catholic moral theologian.

== Works ==
- Christliche Sittenlehre oder Unterricht vom Verhalten des Christen, um durch Tugend wahrhaft glücklich zu werden. 2 Bände. 1794.
  - Ferdinand Geminian Wanker at Google Books Band 1. Vierte Ausgabe. 1824.
  - Ferdinand Geminian Wanker at Google Books Band 2. Dritte Ausgabe. 1811.
- Vorlesungen über Religion nach Vernunft und Offenbarung. Für Akademiker und gebildete Christen. 1828
- Gesammelte Schriften. 4 Bände. 1830.

== Bibliography ==
- Digitalised works by Wanker - Universitätsbibliothek Freiburg
- Allgemeine deutsche Real-Encyklopädie für die gebildeten Stände. 7. Auflage, F. A. Brockhaus, Leipzig 1827, 12. Bd., S. 65 (Online)
- Heinrich Doering: Die gelehrten Theologen Deutschlands im achtzehnten und neunzehnten Jahrhundert. Verlag Johann Karl Gottfried Wagner, Neustadt an der Orla 1835, Bd. 4, S. 654, (Online)
- Wilhelm Heinen: Die Anthropologie in der Sittenlehre Ferdinand Geminian Wankers (1758-1824). Albert, Freiburg im Breisgau 1955
- Ernst Münch: Ferdinand Wanker, Professor der Moral und designierter Erzbischof von Freiburg. In: Ders.: Biographisch-historische Studien. Hallberger, Stuttgart 1836, Bd. 2, S. 267–312 (Digitalisat)
- Hans J. Münk: Der Freiburger Moraltheologe Ferdinand Geminian Wanker (1758–1825) und Immanuel Kant: Historisch-vergleichende Studie unter Berücksichtigung weiteren philosophisch-theologischen Gedankenguts der Spätaufklärung. Patmos, Düsseldorf 2006 (online, PDF-Datei)
- Franz Heinrich Reusch (1896). "Wanker, Ferdinand Geminian" . Allgemeine Deutsche Biographie (in German). Vol. 41. Leipzig: Duncker & Humblot. pp. 157–158.
- Friedrich August Schmidt: Neuer Nekrolog der Deutschen. Bernhard Friedrich Voigt, Ilmenau 1826, 2. Jg., 1824, 1. Heft, S. 168 (Online)
