= Joseph Franz Baumeister =

German sculptor

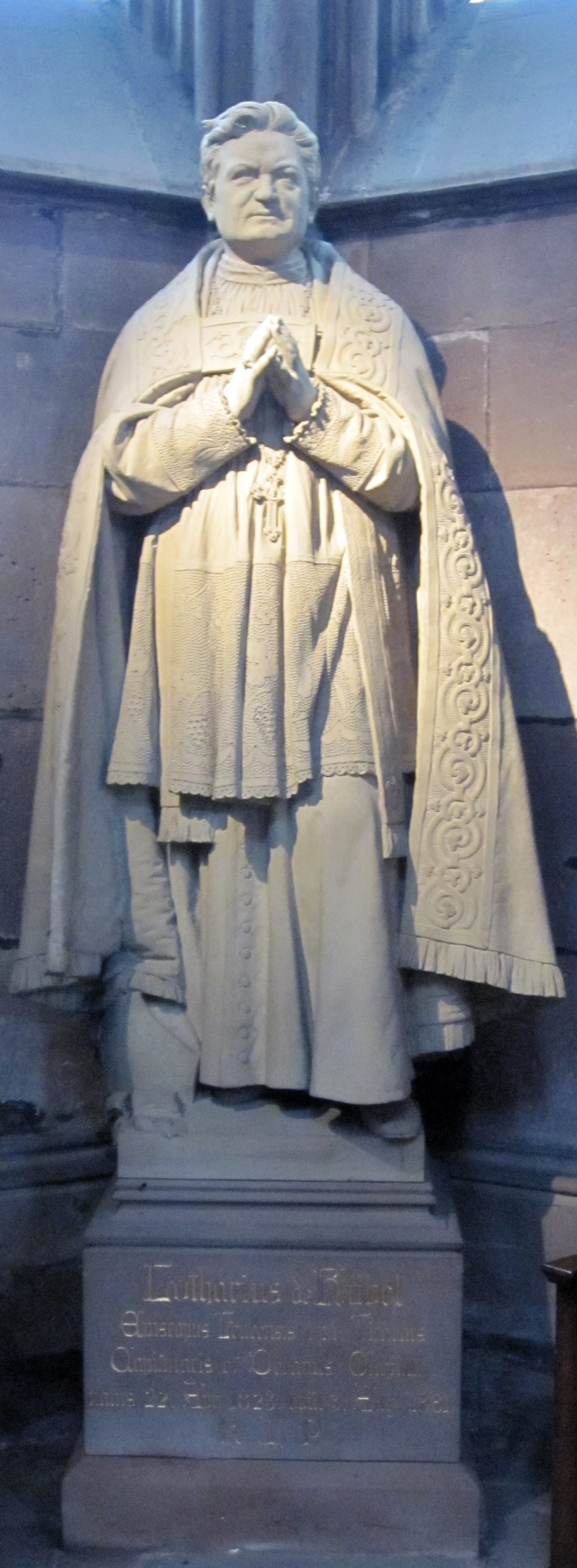
Baumeister's statue of Lothar von Kübel in Freiburg Minster.

Joseph Franz Baumeister (29 January 1857 in Konstanz – 3 May 1933 in Karlsruhe) was a German sculptor.
