= Ochsenberg (Swabian Jura) =

Mountain in Baden-Württemberg, Germany

- Location within Baden-Württemberg

Highest point
- Elevation: 953.6 m (3,129 ft)
- Coordinates: 48°13′49″N 08°58′04″E

Geography
- Location: Zollernalbkreis, Baden-Württemberg, Germany

The Ochsenberg (German pronunciation: [ˈɔksn̩ˌbɛʁk]) is a mountain in Baden-Württemberg, Germany. It is located in the county of Zollernalbkreis.
