= Leuce (titular see) =

Leuce (Ancient Greek: Λευκὴ) was a town and episcopal see in the late Roman province of Thracia.

== The town ==
The town is mentioned as Leuce Acte (Ancient Greek: Λευκὴ Ἀκτή) by Pseudo-Skylax; he wrote that Leuke Akte is on Propontis (eastern Thrace), and as one sails along the coast, he meets the cities in the sequence Leuke Akte, Teiristasis, Heracleia, Ganos, Neon Teichos, and Selymbria. The town has not been identified with certainty. Suggestions include the villages of Lefke and Capolova in northern Greece.

The city was also mentioned by Herodotus and Strabo.

== The bishopric ==
Leuce had a bishop by at latest 381, when a Bishop Symeon of Leuce took part in the First Council of Constantinople. The Notitiae Episcopatuum of the 10th to the 13th centuries mention it among the suffragans of Philippopolis, the metropolitan see of Thracia, thus ruling out the identification of Leuce with today's Plovdiv in Bulgaria, although this identification has been proposed.

Leuce is now listed in the Annuario Pontificio as a titular see of the Catholic Church.
