= Ignaz Heinrich von Wessenberg =

German writer, scholar and liberal Catholic churchman

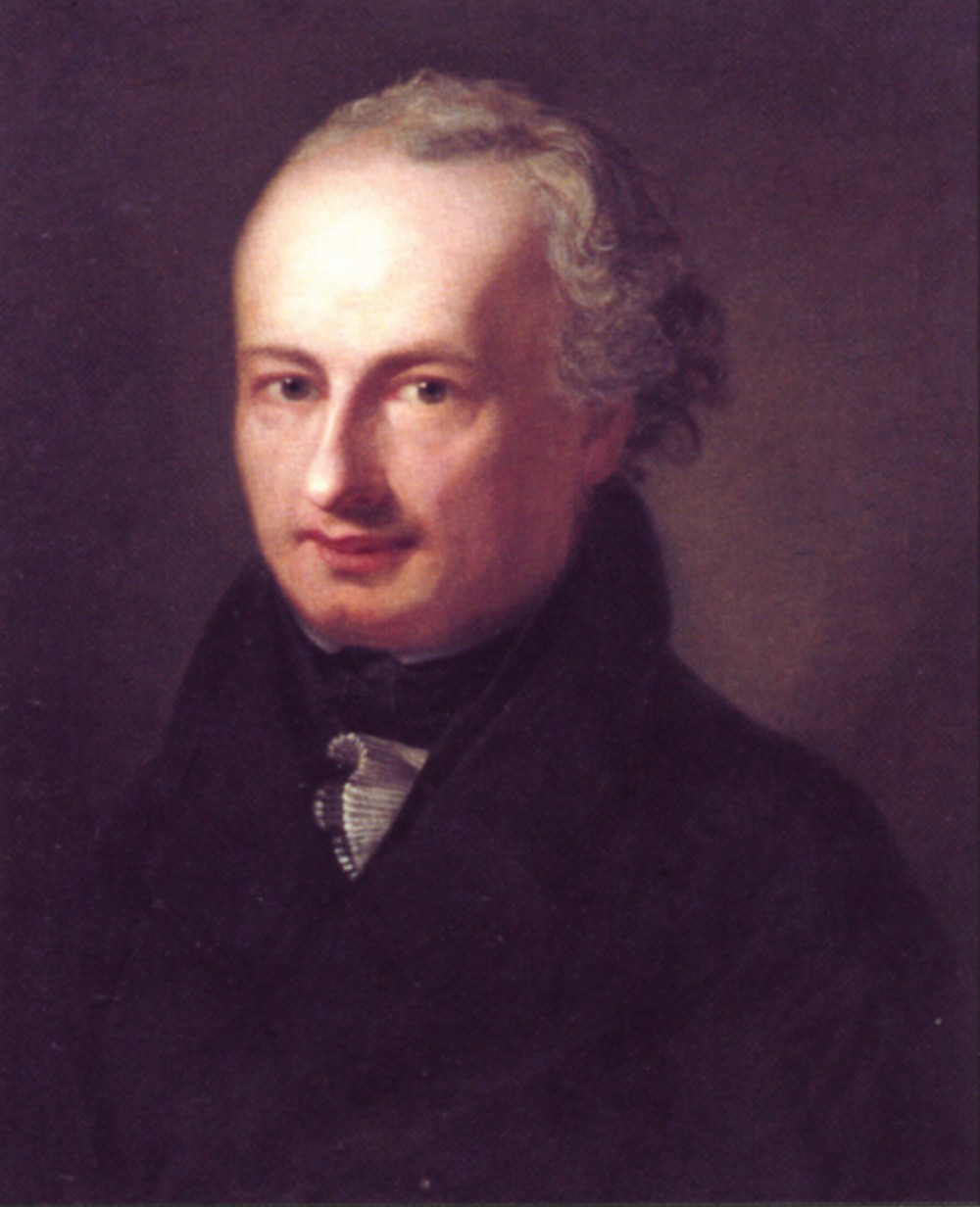
Ignaz Heinrich von Wessenberg, portrait by Marie Ellenrieder, 1819

Ignaz Heinrich Karl von Wessenberg (4 November 1774 – 9 August 1860) was a German writer and scholar, and liberal Catholic churchman as well as Vicar general and administrator of the Diocese of Constance. Imbued from his early youth with Josephinistic and Febronian principles, he advocated a German National Church, somewhat loosely connected with Rome, supported by the State and protected by it against papal interference. He encouraged the use of the vernacular in liturgical texts, the hymn book and the regular Sunday sermon.

== Life ==
Born at Dresden, Ignaz Heinrich Wessenberg was the son of an aristocratic Breisgau family, and destined for a career in the church. His father, Johann Philipp Karl von Wessenberg, was a tutor of the princes of the electoral House of Wettin. In 1776 his family returned to Freiburg in Outer Austria, most of this now in south Germany. His elder brother Johann von Wessenberg later entered the diplomatic service of the Habsburg monarchy.

Ignaz von Wessenberg studied theology at the Jesuit school of Augsburg and the universities of Dillingen, Würzburg and Vienna. He was influenced theologically by Johann Michael Sailer. At the age of eighteen he was already canon at Constance, Augsburg and Basel. In 1798, Prince-Bishop Dalberg sent Wessenberg to Bern on a diplomatic mission to the newly constituted Helvetic Republic. Wessenberg contributed to forming the Articles of Association (autumn 1801), which secured ecclesiastical rights in the Swiss part of the diocese of Constance. His work there was recognised by Pope Pius VII.

In 1802 Prince-Bishop Karl Theodor von Dalberg appointed him Vicar general for the Diocese of Constance, though he was still only a subdeacon. It was not until 1812 that he was ordained a priest, at Fulda when he was age 38.

It had already been before this that Wessenberg had revealed his liberal views of religion and the Catholic Church, in a work entitled Der Geist des Zeitalters (Zürich, 1801). In 1802 he founded the monthly review Geistliche Monatsschrift, which he edited and used to spread his ideas of religious enlightenment. The protests against this review were such that Dalberg ordered its suspension on 25 May 1804. It was replaced by the Konstanzer Pastoralarchiv, which was less offensive and continued to be published annually in two volumes till 1827.

It remained Wessenberg's mission to see a National German Church formed under Primate Dalberg. In pursuit of this, representations he made at Napoleon's 1811 council in Paris, and at the 1815 Congress of Vienna, bore no fruit.

== Vicar general ==
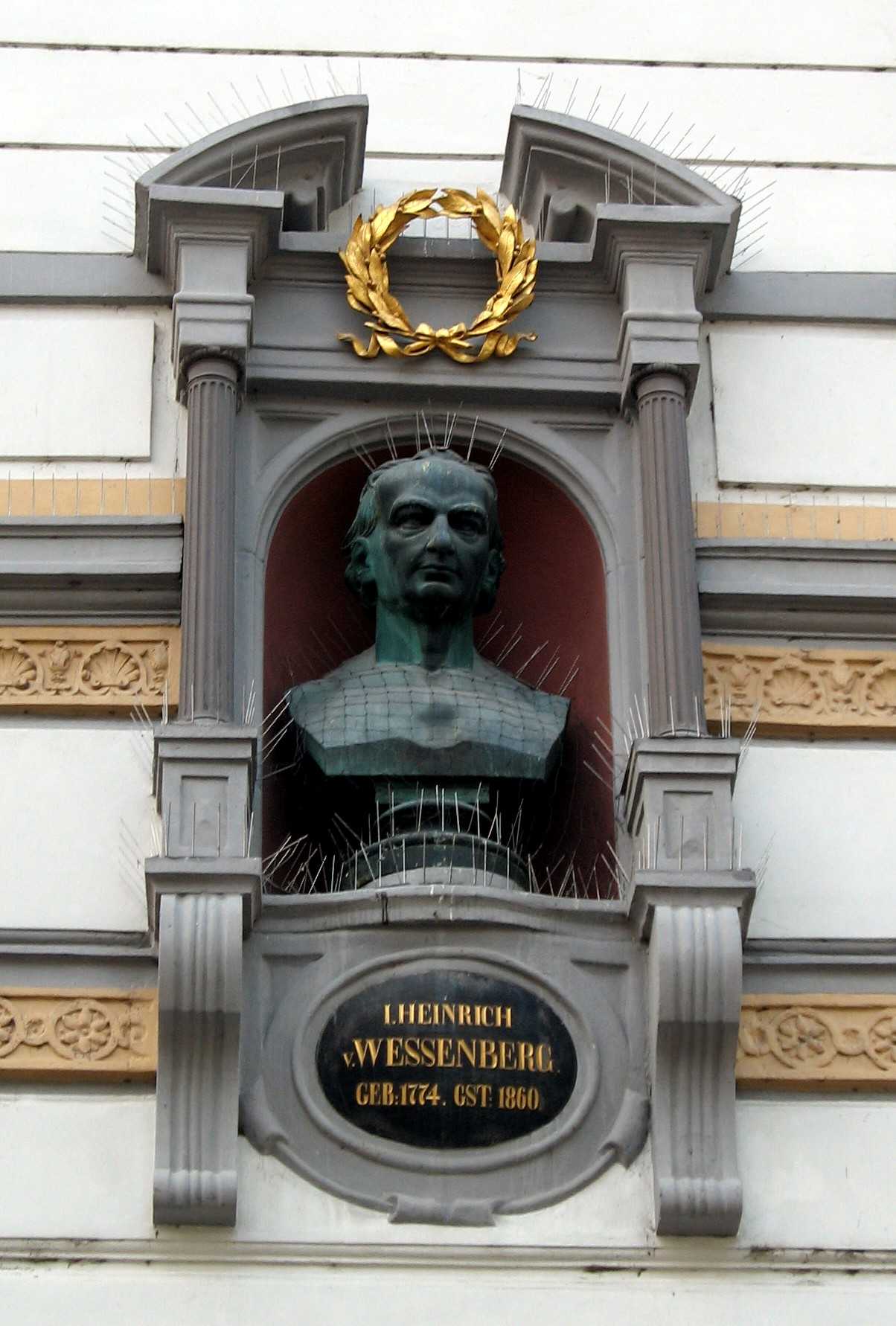
Bust of Ignaz Heinrich von Wessenberg by Hans Baur, at the Wessenberghaus in Constance

A progressive churchman, Wessenberg set about abolishing everything he considered superfluous or superstitious about religious customs. In 1806 he did away with various holy days of obligation in the cantons of Aargau and St. Gallen. He cooperated with the Napoleonic Swiss government at Lucerne in the suppression of monasteries. He gained support from the clergy, but in the Swiss portion of the Diocese of Constance, Wessenberg's innovations aroused considerable disquiet.

When Wessenberg issued orders (1808) in the case of mixed marriages to permit a male offspring to be brought up in his father's religion; a female offspring in that of her mother, he was called to account by Fabrizio Sceberras Testaferrata, papal nuncio at Lucerne. Especially objectionable had been Wessenberg's many matrimonial and other dispensations, exceeding his competence. However, Wessenberg retorted that nothing had been done beyond the Bishop of Constance's rightful authority. Furthermore, he gave Testaferrata to understand that he did not recognise the Apostolic Nunciature.

As the authorised representative of Prince Primate Dalberg, Wessenberg attended the Congress of Vienna in 1814-15. He pushed for a reorganisation of the German church under the leadership of a primate, and for a concordat with the Holy See to cover all German states. Given the particular interests of the Roman Curia and various heads of state, his efforts came to nought. The heads of state wanted state bishops, each subject to their respective rulers. The Curia was not inclined to support primal leadership of a coalesced German church, resembling bygone imperial times.

Wessenberg's administration was noteworthy especially for his deep solicitude for better training and stricter discipline of the clergy, and his insisting on regular Sunday sermons in parish churches, plus religious instruction twice a week in state schools. Regular pastoral conferences for the continuing education of the clergy were at his instigation. He published various books of prayers and hymns for use in his diocese. Keen to strengthen parish life, he did not undermine traditional Baroque popular piety. He lent particular encouragement to pilgrimages, festivals, brotherhoods, and hearing Mass at religious houses.

After disparate requests from Swiss catholics, Wessenberg's reformist plans in that part of the diocese were halted by Pius VII. In a Brief of 21 October 1814, the Swiss cantons were severed from the Diocese of Constance. On 2 November of the same year the Pope ordered Bishop Dalberg to depose Wessenberg from the office of vicar-general without delay. At the beginning of 1815 Wessenberg was replaced temporarily as Vicar general by Canon von Roll. The reason was kept private and the Pope's order remained secret. In the summer of 1815 Dalberg asked the administration of Baden to confirm Wessenberg as his coadjutor bishop, carrying with it the right of succession. Baden's government acceded to Dalberg's wish, but the coadjutorship was not recognised by Rome.

That same year Wessenberg published anonymously a notorious anti-papal treatise entitled Die deutsche Kirche, Ein Vorschlag zu ihrer neuen Begründung und Einrichtung. It is a plea for his scheme of a German National Church, and suggests detailed plans as to its organisation. On 17 February 1817, a week after Dalberg's death, the chapter of Constance elected Wessenberg as Diocesan administrator and Vicar capitular (a cleric chosen by a cathedral chapter to manage a bishopric during a vacancy. However, in a Brief of 15 March 1817, his election was invalidated by Pius VII.

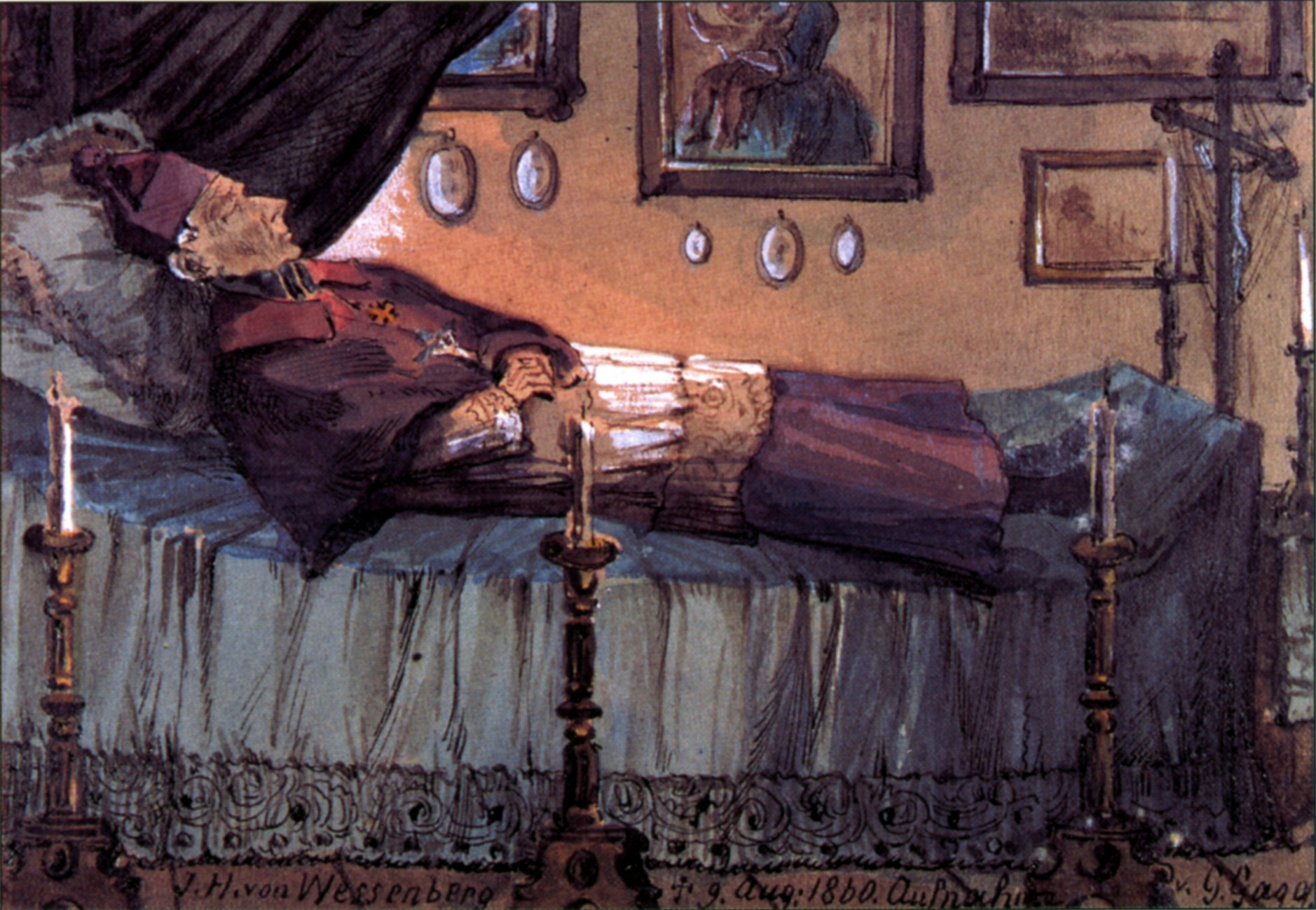
Ignaz Heinrich von Wessenberg on his deathbed, painted by Gebhard Gagg, 1860

In July Wessenberg travelled to Rome, planning to win the pope over. He hoped to return as primate of his projected German Church or, at least, as Bishop of Constance. He was kindly received by Cardinal Ercole Consalvi, the secretary of state, but was told that, before the pope would enter into any negotiations with him, he would have to resign as administrator. As had been required of François Fénelon, Wessenberg would have to declare that he abjured all of what the pope disapproved. Refusing to submit, he left Rome and, sanctioned by the government of Baden, continued to act as administrator of Constance, in flagrant disobedience to the pope, until 1827. In his Bull Provida sollersque of 16 August 1821, Pius VII suppressed the Diocese of Constance, distributing its episcopal care between the newly founded dioceses of Rottenburg and Freiburg (whose first archbishop, Bernhard Boll, was appointed in 1827).

After his retirement in 1827 Wessenberg led a private life as a citizen of Konstanz. Here he continued to give vent to his anti-papal sentiments and to canvass his rationalistic views on religion and the Catholic Church, via various treatises, and frequent contributions to the anti-religious review: Freimüthige Blätter für Deutsche, in Beziehung auf Krieg, Politik und Staatswirthschaft (i.e. Straightforward papers for Germans, relating to war, politics and political economy), published in Konstanz over the years 1830–44.

Wessenberg died in Konstanz at age 85, and was buried in the left aisle of the Konstanz Minster.

== Legacy ==
The "sanctuary for morally neglected girls", which he had founded in 1855, later became the Wessenberg social centre.

His collection of paintings formed the basis of the Municipal Wessenberg Gallery at the Rosgarten Museum in Konstanz. His comprehensive private library is today kept at the University of Konstanz.

In recognition of his promotion of education, the Wessenberg-Schule in Konstanz was named after him in 1979.

== Works ==
Wessenberg's chief literary productions are:

- Die grossen Kirchenversammlungen des 15. und 16. Jahrhunderts in Beziehung auf Kirchenverbesserung (4 vols., Constance, 1840, 2nd ed., 1845), extremely anti-papal (cf. Hefele, in Tübinger Quartalschrift, 1841, 616 sq.)
- Die Stellung des römischen Stuhles gegenuber dem Geiste des 19. Jahrhunderts (Zürich, 1833)
- Die Bisthumssynode und die Erfordernisse und Bedingungen einer heilsamen Herstellung derselben (Freiburg, 1849). T

The last-named two works were placed on the Index.

Wessenberg is the author of a collection of poems (7 vols., Stuttgart, 1843–54), a number of which were set to music by Beethoven.
