= Stuttgart Cathedral =

- Cathedral of St Eberhard
- German: Domkirche Sankt Eberhard
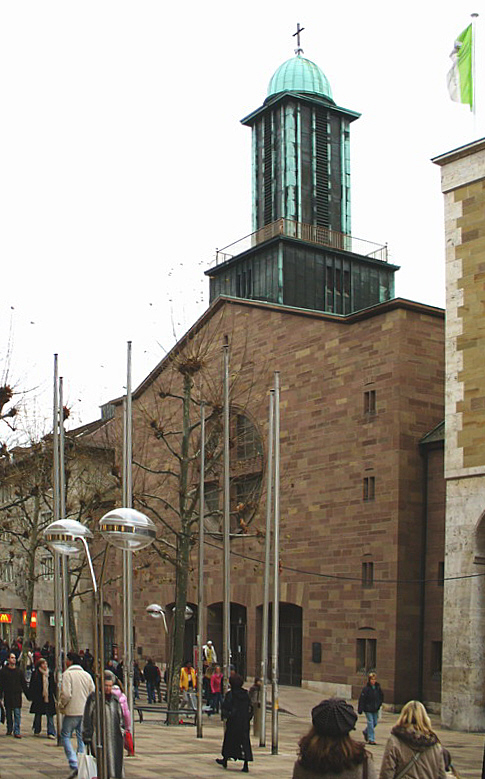

- Location within Baden-Württemberg
- 48°46′47″N 9°10′48″E
- Location: Stauffenbergstraße 3 Stuttgart, Baden-Württemberg
- Country: Germany
- Denomination: Roman Catholic
- Website: www.steberhard.de

History
- Status: Co-cathedral (also parish church)
- Consecrated: October 1, 1811

Architecture
- Functional status: Active
- Architectural type: Cathedral
- Years built: 10th century (parish); 1808-1811; 1955 (rebuilt)

Administration
- Province: Freiburg im Breisgau (aka Upper Rhenish)
- Diocese: Rottenburg-Stuttgart
- Parish: St Eberhard

Clergy
- Rector: Msgr Dr. Christian Hermes

Stuttgart Cathedral or St Eberhard's Cathedral (Domkirche St. Eberhard, previously Stadtpfarrkirche St. Eberhard) is a church in the German city of Stuttgart. It is dedicated to Saint Eberhard of Salzburg. Since 1978, it has been co-cathedral of the Roman Catholic Diocese of Rottenburg-Stuttgart, whose main cathedral is Rottenburg Cathedral - the church's promotion marked the 150th anniversary of the diocese and its renaming as the Diocese of Rottenburg-Stuttgart. The parish dates back to the medieval era while the current building was completed in 1955, eleven years after it was mostly destroyed by Allied air raids in 1944.

== History ==
=== Early years ===
Liudolf erected a small church around 950 and remnants of the old collegiate church (stiftskirche) were discovered under the nave of the current Cathedral. The fortunes of the Cathedral has largely been determined by the religion of the House of Württemberg, who ruled the area which comprises the present-day state Baden-Württemberg, of which Stuttgart is the capital. Catholicism was banned when the family converted to Protestantism.

In its early years, the church was administered by the friars of Altenburg Abbey. During the Reformation, Stuttgart became mainly Protestant and Catholic mass was banned from the city from 1535 until the Peace of Augsburg was signed in 1555. Stuttgart became Catholic again after the Holy Roman Empire and its allies triumphed over the Protestant forces in the Battle of Nördlingen. The church came under the administration of the Jesuits, who notably desecrated the grave of theologian and Reformer Johannes Brenz. Catholic mass was once again banned with the signing of the Treaty of Westphalia. The Stiftskirche became a Protestant church and many restrictions were placed on the Catholic population. These restrictions began to be relaxed as the now Kingdom of Württemberg became secularised (see German mediatization), although Protestantism remained the dominant and de facto state religion. The government allowed for a designated priest to minister to the Catholic population; one such priest was Johann Baptist von Keller.

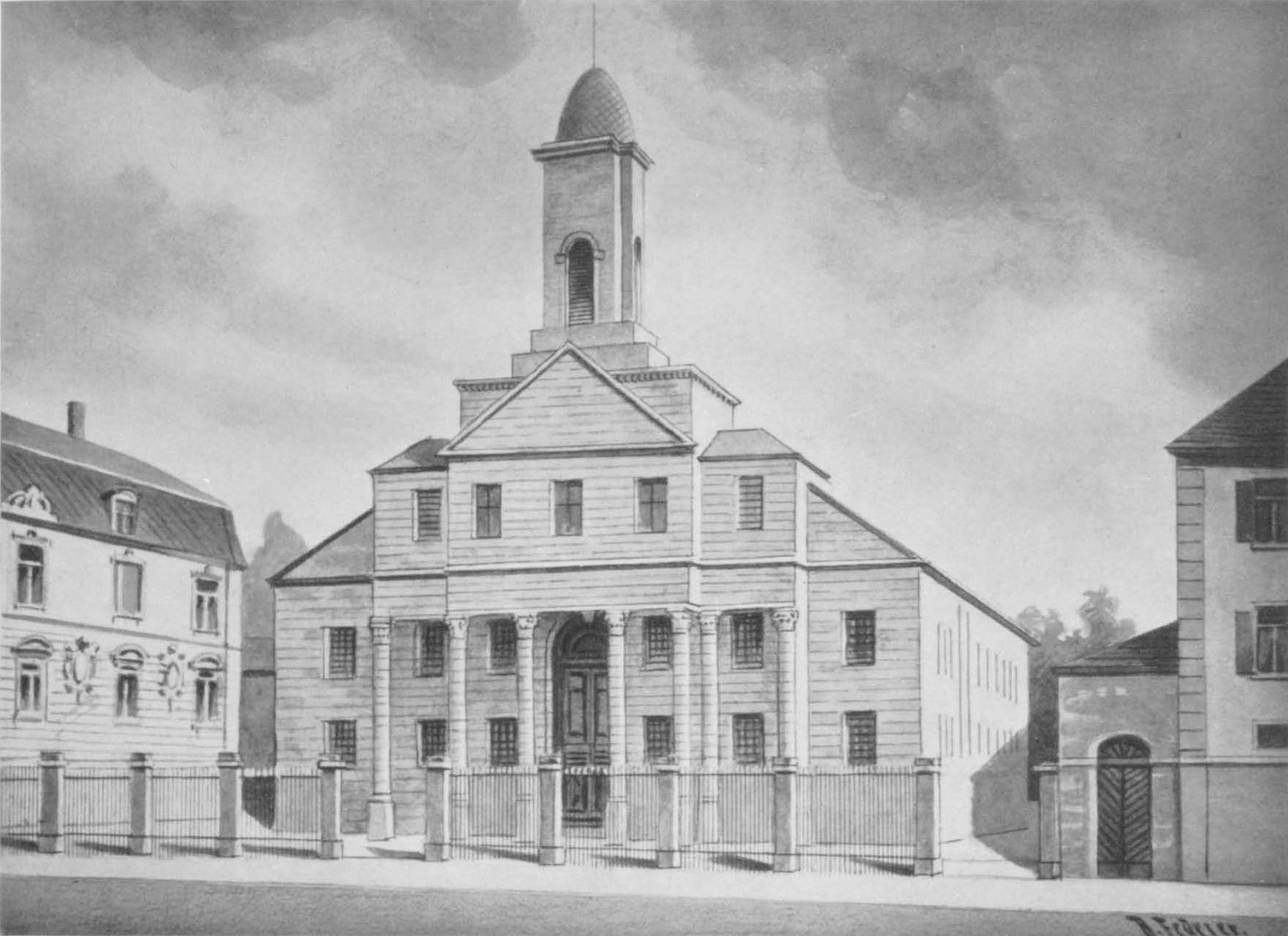
The church as it was around 1890

=== The "new" church ===
In 1808, the foundation stone for the new Catholic church was laid with little fanfare. It was completed in 1811 and consecrated by Bishop Franz Karl Joseph Fürst von Hohenlohe-Waldenburg-Schillingsfürst, the General Vicar of Wurttemberg, later Bishop of Augsburg. Eberhard was chosen to be the patron saint. Initially, Eberhard of Salzburg was chosen but later Eberhard of Nellenburg (de), founder of Kloster Allerheiligen, Schaffhausen, was the preferred choice. During Nazi rule, theologian Helmut Thielicke was based at Stuttgart and gave lectures and sermons at the cathedral. The rectory and most of the church, along with many important buildings in the city, were destroyed during the bombing of Stuttgart in World War II in 1944. In his book Man of God, Thielicke described the scene: "I can still see the towering torch of this venerable house of God. [...] ...and I stood there holding in my hand a key to a door that no longer existed..."

=== Post-war era ===
From 1948 to 1955, parishioners worshiped at a repaired section of the Kunstgebäude Stuttgart (English: Arts Building) (de) on the Schlossplatz while the church was being rebuilt. It was reopened in 1955, having been rebuilt in a simplified, modernist style. In 1978 it was elevated from parish church (German: Stadtpfarrkirche) to co-cathedral status. The Diocese of Rottenburg was subsequently renamed Rottenburg-Stuttgart to reflect the change in status.

== Organ ==
The organ was built in 1982 by renowned German organ builder Winfried Albiez (de). With 56 stops and 3700 pipes, it is the largest organ constructed by Albiez and one of the most important organs of the state capital. A second smaller organ in the choir was built in 2006.

=== Specifications of the main organ ===
I Rückpositiv C–g^{3}
1.	Prästant	8′
2.	Bourdon	8′
3.	Quintade	8′
4.	Principal	4′
5.	Rohrflöte	4′
6.	Nasat	2^{2}/_{3}′
7.	Octav	2′
8.	Terz	1^{3}/_{5}′
9.	Larigot	1^{1}/_{3}′
10.	Sifflöte	1′
11.	Scharff IV	1′
12.	Rohrflöten-Sordun	16′
13.	Krummhorn	8′
	Tremulant

II Hauptwerk C–g^{3}
14.	Prästant	16′
15.	Principal	8′
16.	Rohrgedeckt	8′
17.	Spitzgambe	8′
18.	Octav	4′
19.	Nachthorn	4′
20.	Quinte	2^{2}/_{3}′
21.	Superoktav	2′
22.	Mixtur V–VI	1^{1}/_{3}′
23.	Cornett V (ab f^{0})	8′
24.	Trompete	16′
25.	Trompete	8′
26.	Clairon (was Vox Humana 8' moved to Expression pedal in 1991)	4′
	Tremulant

III Schwellwerk C–g^{3}
27.	Bourdon	16′
28.	Principal	8′
29.	Flute harmonique	8′
30.	Salicional	8′
31.	Voix celeste (ab c^{0})	8′
32.	Flute	4′
33.	Prestant	4′
34.	Nasard	2^{2}/_{3}′
35.	Doublette	2′
36.	Quarte de Nasard	2′
37.	Tierce	1^{3}/_{5}′
38.	Fourniture IV–V	2′
39.	Cymbale IV	^{1}/_{2}′
40.	Basson	16′
41.	Trompette harmonique	8′
42.	Hautbois	8′
	Voix humaine (from the Hauptwerk, a Doublette 2' was removed)	8'
43.	Clairon	4′
	Tremulant

Pedal C–f^{1}
Untersatz (since 2008) uses Principalbass from c	32'
44.	Principalbass	16′
45.	Subbass	16′
46.	Quintbass	10^{2}/_{3}′
47.	Octavbass	8′
48.	Gedecktbass	8′
49.	Choralbass	4′
50.	Spillflöte	4′
51.	Rauschquinte II	2^{2}/_{3}′
52.	Mixtur III	2′
53.	Bombarde (uses Posaune from c)	32′
54.	Posaune	16′
55.	Trompete	8′
56.	Zink	4′

=== Specification of the choir organ ===
I Hauptwerk C-g^{3}
1.	Principal	8′
2.	Flaut major	8′
3.	Octave	4′
4.	Octave (aus Nr. 5)	2′
5.	Mixtur III–IV	2′

II Schwellwerk C-g^{3}
6.	Doppelgedackt	8′
7.	Viola	8′
8.	Flaut travers	4′
9.	Gemshorn	4′
10.	Trompette	8′
	Tremulant

Pedal C-f^{1}
11.	Subbass	16′
12.	Gedacktbass (aus Nr. 11)	8′

== Notable burials ==
- Johannes Brenz, reformer

== Bibliography ==
- Egon Hopfenzitz (ed.): Kirche im Herzen der Stadt. 200 Jahre Religionsfreiheit in Württemberg, 200 Jahre Pfarrgemeinde St. Eberhard in Stuttgart. Schwabenverlag, Ostfildern 2006, ISBN 3-7966-1308-X
