= Colonia Legionis =

Colonia Legionis (Latin for "Colony of the Legion") may refer to:

- Colonia Legionis II, an alternative name for Isca Augusta (present-day Caerleon in Wales)
- Colonia Iulia Augusta Legionis VII, present-day Tubusuctu in north Africa
