= Joannes Baptista Sproll =

- Bishop of Rottenburg
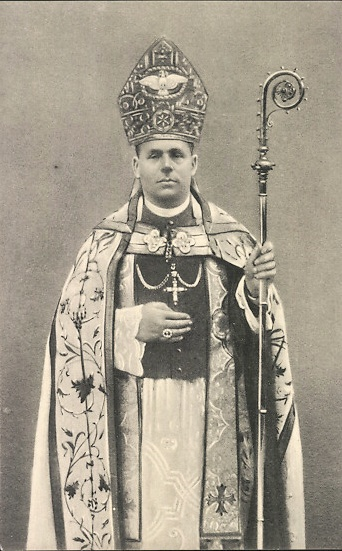
- Joannes Baptista Sproll in 1915
- Church: Catholic Church
- Diocese: Diocese of Rottenburg
- In office: 29 March 1927 – 4 March 1949
- Predecessor: Paul Wilhelm von Keppler
- Successor: Carl Joseph Leiprecht
- Previous posts: Titular Bishop of Halmiros (1916-1927); Auxiliary Bishop of Rottenburg (1916-1927)

Orders
- Ordination: 16 July 1895
- Consecration: 18 June 1916 by Paul Wilhelm Keppler

Personal details
- Born: 2 October 1870 Schweinhausen, Kingdom of Württemberg
- Died: 4 March 1949 (aged 78) Rottenburg am Neckar, Württemberg-Hohenzollern, French Zone, Allied-occupied Germany
- Coat of arms

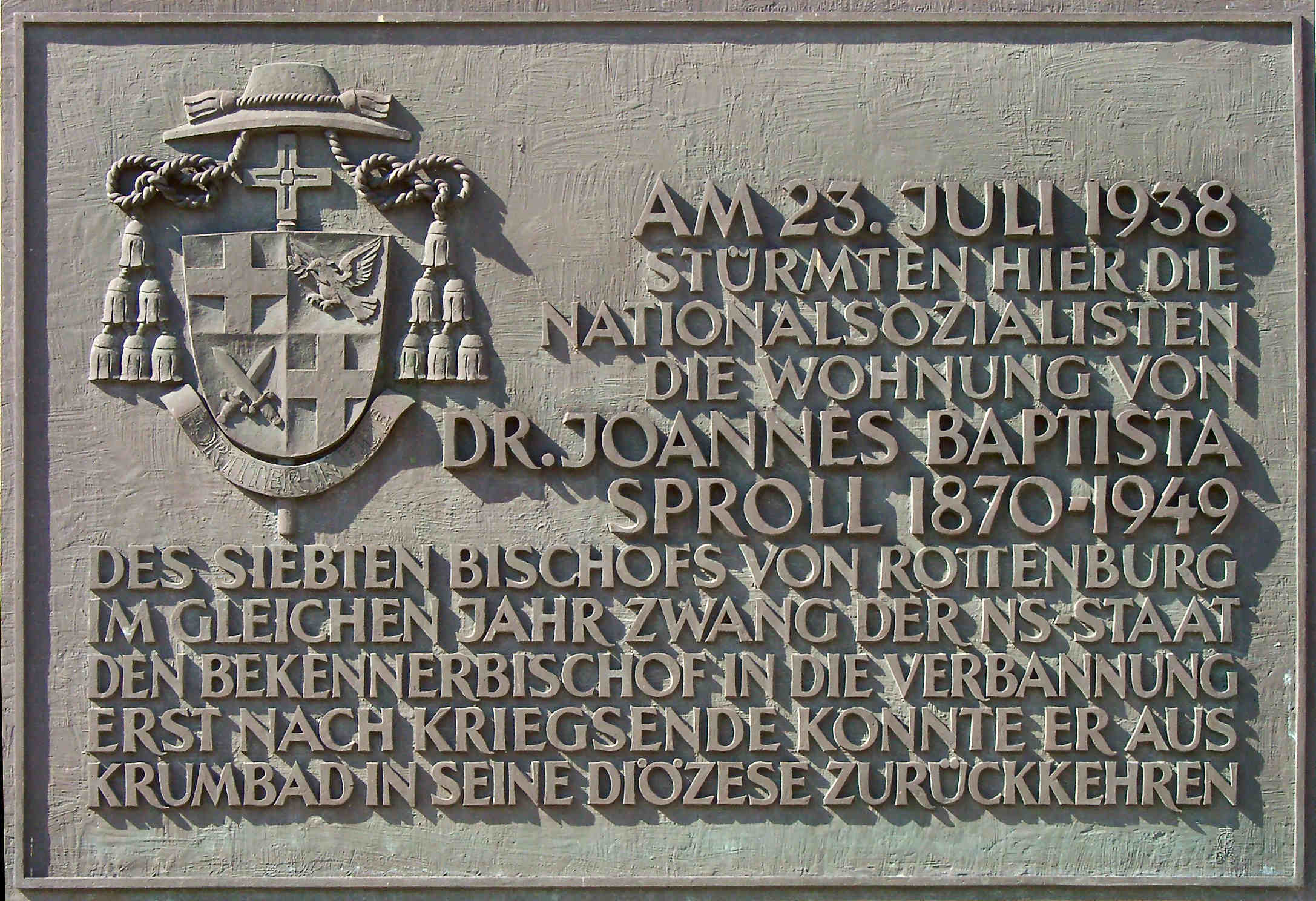
A memorial plaque to Bishop Sproll in Rottenburg. It reads: On 23 June 1938 the National Socialists stormed the apartment of Dr. Joannes Baptista Sproll, 1870-1949, the seventh Bishop of Rottenburg. In the same year, the government forced the bishop into exile; he could not return to his diocese from Krumbad until after the war

Joannes Baptista Sproll (German: [joˈanːəs bapˈtiːsta ˈʃpʁɔl]; 2 October 1870 – 4 March 1949) was a German bishop and prominent opponent of Nazism.

== Biography ==
Joannes Baptista Sproll was born in Schweinhausen, near Biberach, the son of street mender Josef Sproll and Anna Maria (née Freuer). He attended the Latin school in Biberach and Gymnasium Ehingen before studying Catholic theology at the University of Tübingen from 1890 to 1894. In 1898, he received his doctorate for work on the history of law and constitution at Tübingen's St. George Monastery. He became Bishop of Rottenburg on 14 June 1927.

=== Nazi-era opposition ===
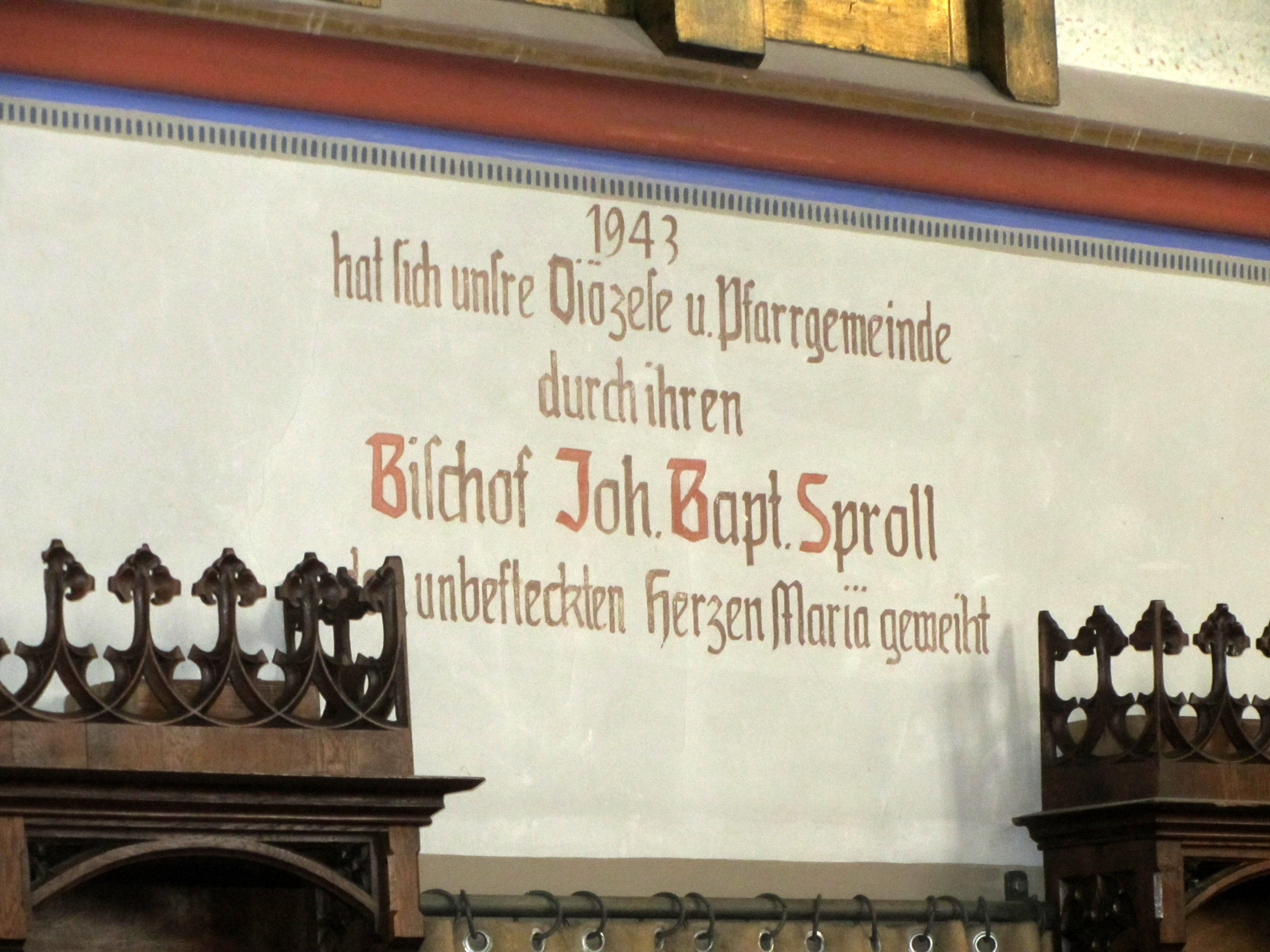
Inscription St. Martin Erolzheim 1943

Though initially welcoming the 1933 Reichskonkordat between Nazi Germany and the Holy See, Sproll later became a public opponent of the regime. His demonstrative abstention from the April 1938 Reichstag election – which included a referendum on the Anschluss – prompted Nazi-orchestrated demonstrations and legal proceedings against him. On 23 July 1938, SA men stormed Rottenburg Bishop's Palace, and Sproll was expelled from his diocese, living under Gestapo surveillance in Krumbad (Diocese of Augsburg) until 1945. His refusal to resign despite pressure from Nuncio Cesare Orsenigo earned him the epithet "Martyr Bishop".

He himself summed up this period:

The open persecution of bishops and priests and the difficulties of worship and religious education have brought one good thing: they have opened the eyes of the Catholic people and welded clergy and faithful into a united front. In this unity, they broke the tenacious resistance of the Church's enemies and preserved their sacred faith in God, Christ, and the Church over two difficult decades of hardship.

—

Sproll articulated his resistance in theological terms during a 1934 sermon at the Fulda Bishops' Conference, later cited as inspiration for Cardinal Faulhaber's encyclical "Mit brennender Sorge":

Boniface holds the cross in one hand and the gospel book in the other. This is the symbol of an apostolic calling, the symbol of golden fidelity. […] But alongside it, many raise the axe to destroy the Church […] to smash the cross he erected in German lands, to tear the image of the Crucified from the hearts of the Germanic people. […] Christianity will have to endure great storms against this so-called "religion of blood and race." Fearlessly, you must hold fast to the sacred heritage you received from your parents. 'Stand firm in the faith!' the apostle urges.

— Franz X. Schmid (2019). Hidden Inspirer. Lindenberg: Kunstverlag Josef Fink. p. 48. ISBN 978-3-95976-197-0.

On October 4, 1938, amid the Sudeten Crisis, Sproll wrote to his diocesan flock: "A war more terrible than humanity has ever experienced has been averted from us." At a men's pilgrimage on September 19, 1939, Sproll made positive comments about Jews and their religion and negative remarks about the Kristallnacht pogrom.

=== World War II and death ===
On 1 August 1940, Archbishop Conrad Gröber of Freiburg and Vicar General Max Kottmann (acting for Sproll) formally protested the Grafeneck euthanasia program – preceding Bishop Clemens August Graf von Galen famous denunciation. Despite a 1939 pastoral letter praising German troops' loyalty:

"Already, from all our communities, the able-bodied men have rushed to the borders, following the call of the Führer, to protect home and hearth, and we know that they will fulfill their duty, faithful to their military oath, even at the cost of their lives."

Church historian Franz X. Schmid maintains Sproll remained "an avowed pacifist" and member of the "Peace Association of German Catholics."

Sproll died in Rottenburg am Neckar on 4 March 1949. His 1941 refusal to resign when requested by a papal envoy reportedly made him persona non grata in post-war church circles.

Preceded by Paul Wilhelm von Keppler	Bishop of Rottenburg; 1927—1949	Succeeded by Carl Joseph Leiprecht
