= Percennia gens =

The gens Percennia was a plebeian family at ancient Rome. Members of this gens first appear in history in the early years of the Empire, and several of them were of senatorial rank, although it is not known what magistracies they held. The most famous of the family may have been the Percennius who led a mutiny of the Pannonian legions in AD 14, which Drusus was obliged to put down.

== Origin ==
The nomen Percennius belongs to a class of gentilicia of Oscan origin, derived from earlier names, in this instance the Oscan praenomen Percennus. (Note: Chase proposed this name as a hypothetical root, but examples are known from Oscan inscriptions: CIL IX, 2610 (Numerius Ceius Percenni f.), CIL IX, 4104 (Statius Selusius Percenni f.).) The ancestors of the Percennii were most likely Samnites, Sabines, or came from another Oscan-speaking people.

== Praenomina ==
The main praenomina among the Percennii were Marcus and Lucius, but several other common praenomina were also used, including Gaius, Quintus, Publius, and Titus. The only other name found among the Percennii appears to be Decimus, which appears among a family of senatorial rank in imperial times.

== Members ==
This list includes abbreviated praenomina. For an explanation of this practice, see filiation.

- Percennius, a soldier at the commencement of the reign of Tiberius, who instigated a mutiny among the legions in Pannonia. When Drusus arrived to take command of the legions, he had Percennius put to death.
- Lucius Percennius Pollio, a man of senatorial rank, and the father of Lucius Percennius Lascivus.
- Lucius Percennius Lascivus or Monnicus, an eques, son of Lucius Percennius Pollio, and husband of Sabinia Felicitas, was buried at Rome at some point during the third century.
- Decimus Percennius Marcianus, a man of senatorial rank, named on a lead pipe found at Rome.
- Decimus Percennius Rufinus, a man of senatorial rank, named on a lead pipe from the Esquiline Hill, had been governor of one of the imperial provinces.
- Percennius Donatus, named in a dedicatory inscription from Lambaesis in Numidia, dating to the reign of Septimius Severus.
- Percennius Severus, mentioned by the jurist Ulpian, lived about the beginning of the third century.
- Percennia, erected a funerary monument at Tubusuctu in Mauretania Caesariensis, from which the name of the deceased has not been preserved.
- Percennia C. f., buried at Allifae in Campania.
- Percennia C. l., a freedwoman buried at Florentia in Etruria.
- Percennia L. f., the wife of Marcus Seius, and mother of Marcus, Quintus, Gaius, and Lucius Seius, buried at the present site of Colli a Volturno, originally in Samnium.
- Gaius Percennius, named in an inscription from Aesernia in Samnium.
- Gaius Percennius, freedman of Protus and Crestus, buried at Rome.
- Marcus Percennius M. f., one of the seviri Augustales, and a judicial magistrate at Bovianum Undecimanorum during the first century.
- Marcus Percennius M. f., buried at Venusia in Apulia.
- Marcus Percennius M. l., a freedman, who set up a monument to Marcus Percennius at Bovianum Undecimanorum.
- Publius Percennius, buried at Rome during the latter half of the second century BC.
- Quintus Percennius, husband of Aurelia Marcianes, buried at Rome.
- Percennia Calliste, wife of Gaius Percennius Reginus, to whom she built a monument at Rome.
- Lucius Percennius L. l. Epicadus, a freedman, buried at Aquilonia in Campania.
- Percennia C. l. Euphrosyne, a freedwoman named in an inscription from Rome.
- Marcus Percennius Eutyches, erected a monument at Rome to his wife, whose name has not been preserved.
- Marcus Percennius Firmus, father of Marcus Percennius Firmus, buried at Ammaedara in Africa Proconsularis, aged ninety-two.
- Marcus Percennius M. f. Firmus, buried at Ammaedara, aged twenty-two.
- Percennia P. f. Galla, buried at Rome, aged ninety-five.
- Percennia Lucifera, the wife of Publius Claudius Zosimus, and mother of Claudia Justa, who was buried at Claternae in Cisalpine Gaul, aged eleven years, three months, and one day.
- Percennius Marcianus, buried at Ammaedara, with a monument dating to the third century.
- Lucius Percennius Maximus, a military official at Misenum in Campania, where he was buried, aged forty-six.
- Marcus Percennius Mursensis, the father of Percennia Sabina, to whom he dedicated a monument at Altinum in Venetia and Histria.
- Lucius Percennius Optatus, buried at Lambaesis, aged fifty-three.
- Titus Percennius Optatus, buried at Lambaesis, aged fifty-three.
- Marcus Percennius Philippus, a soldier mentioned in an inscription from Tilurium in Dalmatia.
- Lucius Percennius Picentinus, together with Marcus Lollius Secundinus set up a monument at Rome to their friend, Lucius Voconius Verus, a soldier in the sixth cohort of the Praetorian Guard.
- Percennia Ↄ. l. Prima, a freedwoman buried at Casinum, a Sabine town at the edge of Latium.
- Percennius Quintilianus, buried at Cirta in Numidia.
- Gaius Percennius Reginus, prefect of a cohort of the vigiles, and husband of Percennia Calliste, buried at Rome, aged forty-four years and ten months, having served twenty-two years.
- Publius Percennius Q. f. Rogatus, buried at Thibaris in Africa Proconsularis, aged fifty-one.
- Percennia Romana, buried at Tubusuctu, aged thirty-two.
- Lucius Percennius Rufio, the former master of Secundius, named in an inscription from Capua.
- Percennia M. f. Sabina, buried at Altinum, aged nineteen years, thirty-five days.
- Publius Percennius Sabinus, a veteran of the second cohort of the Praetorian Guard, donated to Jupiter at Verona.
- Percennia Secunda, daughter of Percennius Optatus, buried at Lambaesis.
- Marcus Percennius Successus, buried at Rome with Octavia Secunda, probably his wife, named as patron of Octavius Cerealis, who erected a monument in their memory.

== See also ==
- List of Roman gentes

== Bibliography ==
- Publius Cornelius Tacitus, Annales.
- Digesta, or Pandectae (The Digest).
- Dictionary of Greek and Roman Biography and Mythology, William Smith, ed., Little, Brown and Company, Boston (1849).
- Theodor Mommsen et alii, Corpus Inscriptionum Latinarum (The Body of Latin Inscriptions, abbreviated CIL), Berlin-Brandenburgische Akademie der Wissenschaften (1853–present).
- Giovanni Battista de Rossi, Inscriptiones Christianae Urbis Romanae Septimo Saeculo Antiquiores (Christian Inscriptions from Rome of the First Seven Centuries, abbreviated ICUR), Vatican Library, Rome (1857–1861, 1888).
- Bulletin Archéologique du Comité des Travaux Historiques et Scientifiques (Archaeological Bulletin of the Committee on Historic and Scientific Works, abbreviated BCTH), Imprimerie Nationale, Paris (1885–1973).
- René Cagnat et alii, L'Année épigraphique (The Year in Epigraphy, abbreviated AE), Presses Universitaires de France (1888–present).
- George Davis Chase, "The Origin of Roman Praenomina", in Harvard Studies in Classical Philology, vol. VIII (1897).
- Paul von Rohden, Elimar Klebs, & Hermann Dessau, Prosopographia Imperii Romani (The Prosopography of the Roman Empire, abbreviated PIR), Berlin (1898).
- Stéphane Gsell, Inscriptions Latines de L'Algérie (Latin Inscriptions from Algeria, abbreviated ILAlg), Edouard Champion, Paris (1922–present).
