= Franz Xaver von Linsenmann =

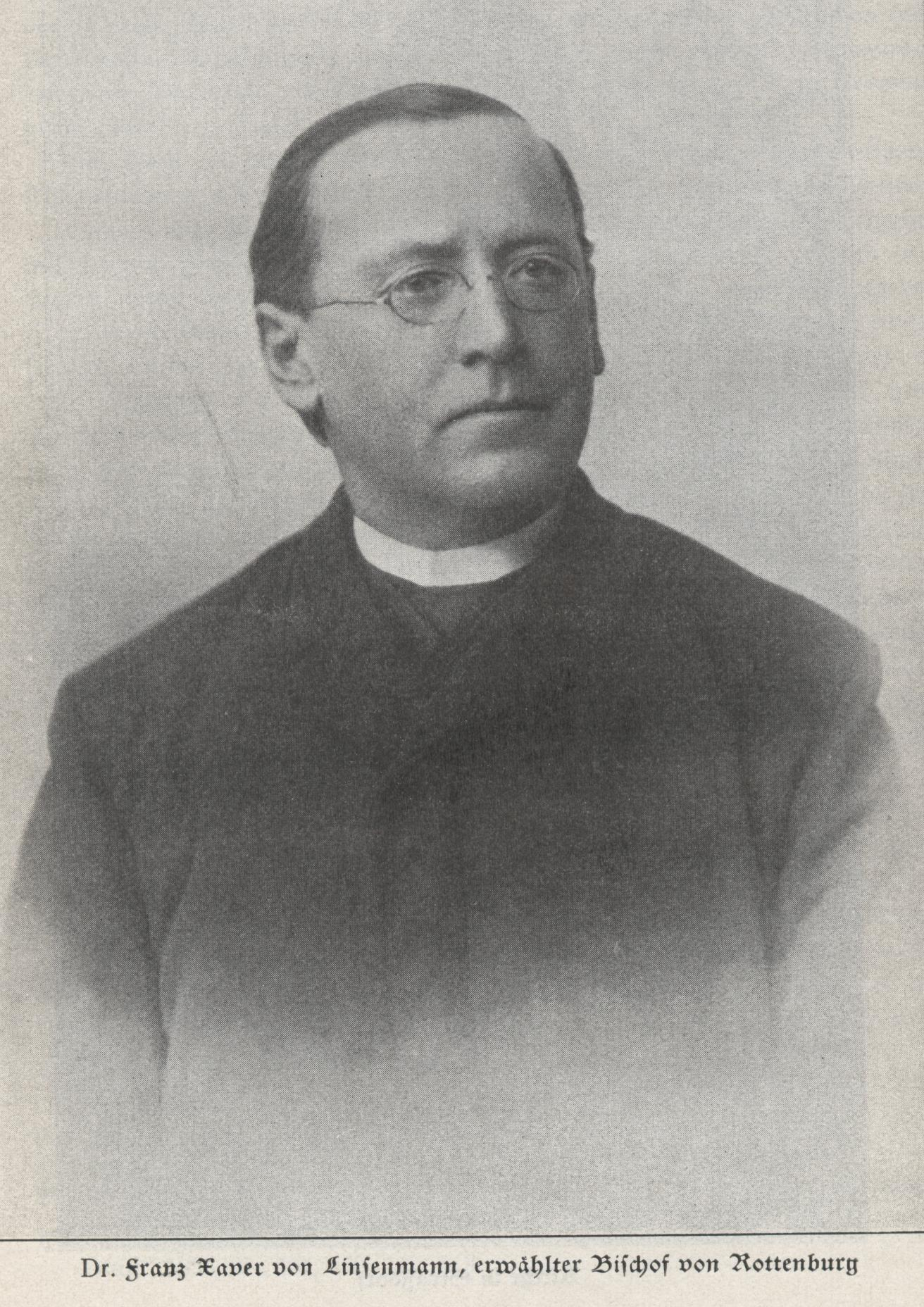
Franz Xaver von Linsenmann.

Franz Xaver von Linsenmann (November 28, 1835 – September 21, 1898) was an important Catholic moral theologian and the Bishop of Rottenburg.

Born in Rottweil, Linsenmann was unanimously elected Bishop of Rottenburg on July 20, 1898, and was proclaimed on September 5. However, he died before his consecration during a curative stay in the Black Forest spa town of Lauterbach.

Preceded by Wilhelm von Reiser	Bishop of Rottenburg; 1898	Succeeded by Paul Wilhelm von Keppler
