= List of cathedrals in Germany =

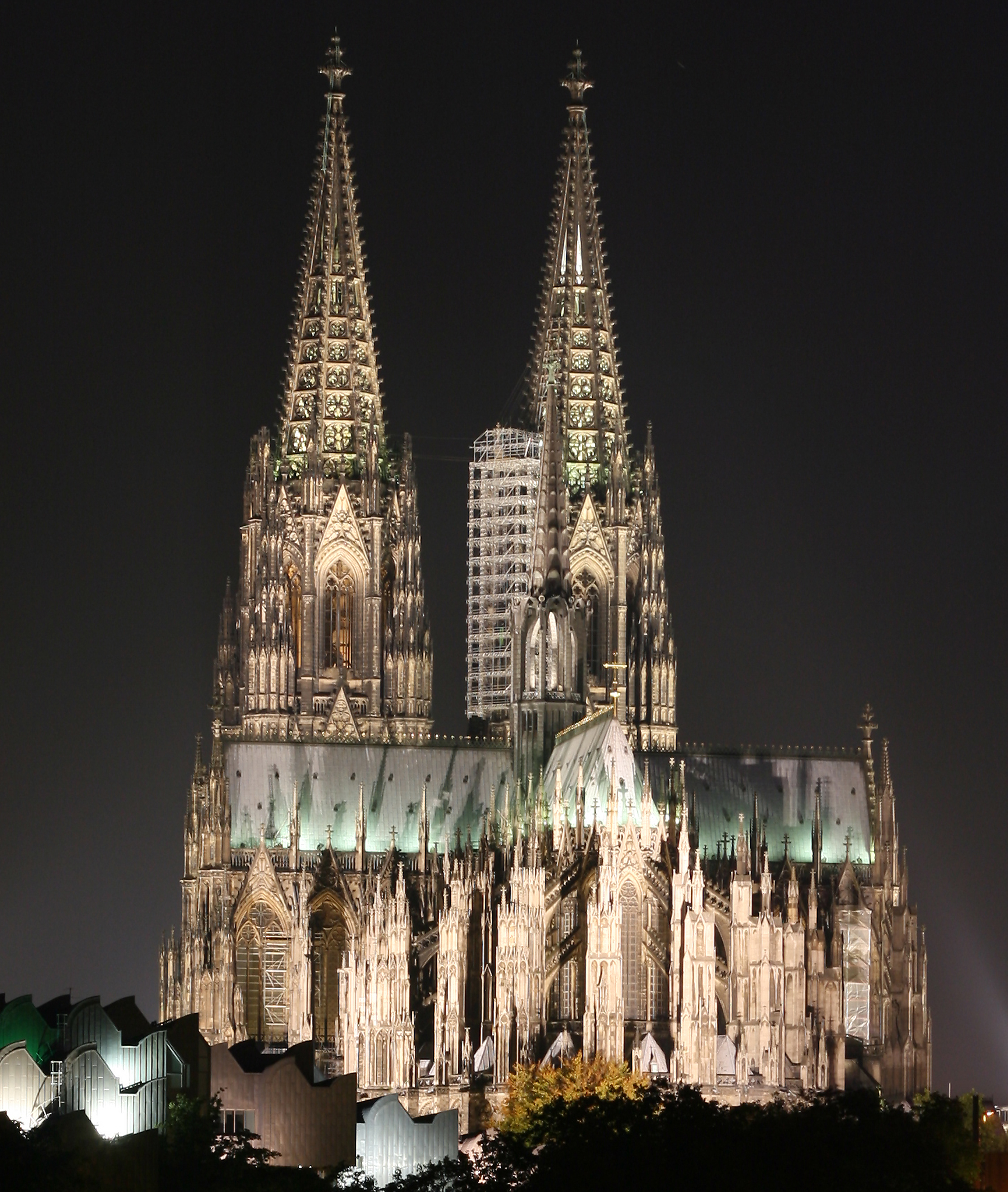
Cologne Cathedral in Cologne.

This is the list of cathedrals in Germany sorted by denomination.

Some pre-Reformation cathedrals in Germany, now within one of the Lutheran or united Protestant churches (co-operating in their umbrella organisation Protestant Church in Germany) still retain the term cathedral, despite the churches Presbyterian polity which does not have bishops (in some Protestant churches) or use the term as a merely honorary title and function, void of any hierarchical supremacy. As cathedrals are often particularly impressive edifices, the term is often used incorrectly as a designation for any large, important church. This is especially true in Berlin, where three Protestant church buildings, which never functioned as cathedrals, are colloquially called cathedral, and Frankfurt Cathedral (German: Dom; cf. Berliner Dom, Deutscher Dom and Französischer Dom, Kaiserdom).

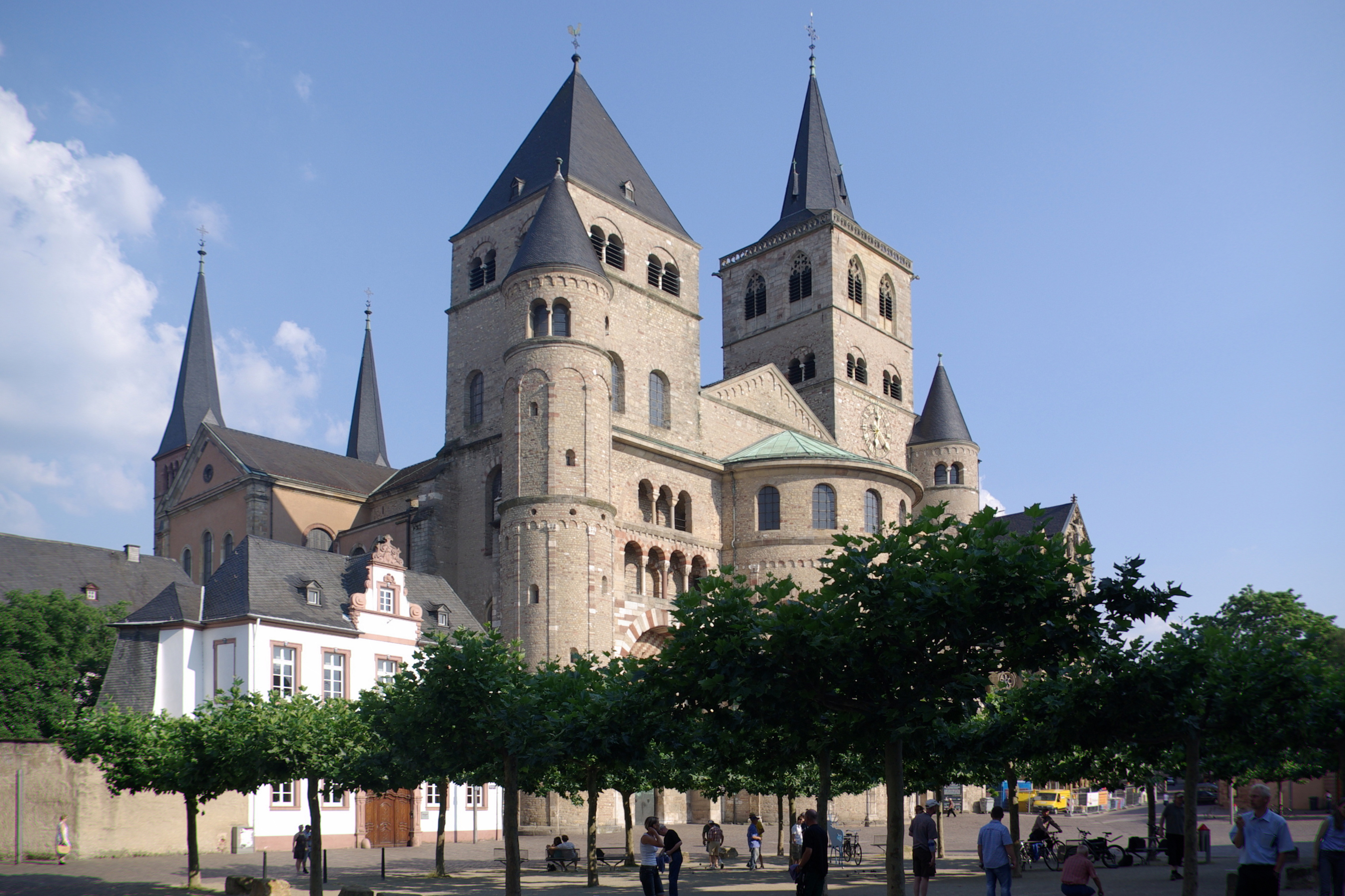
Cathedral of St. Peter in Trier.

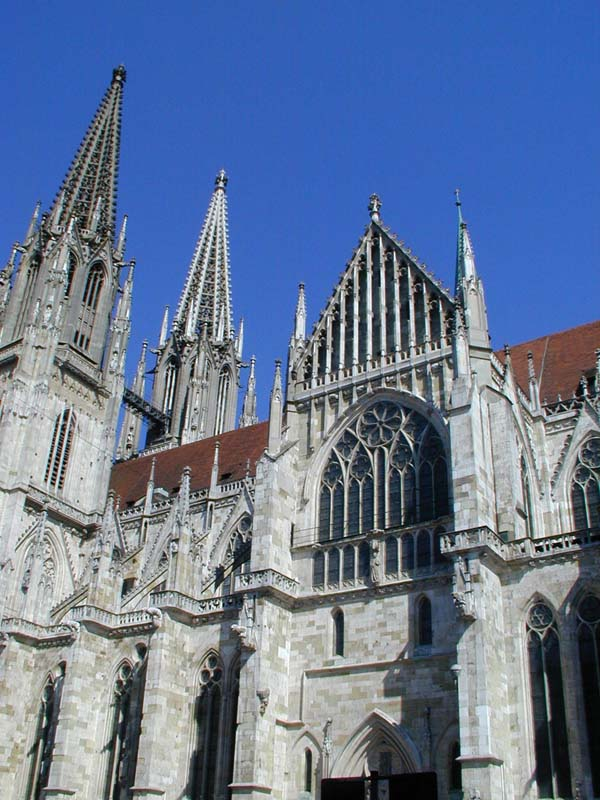
Regensburg Cathedral.

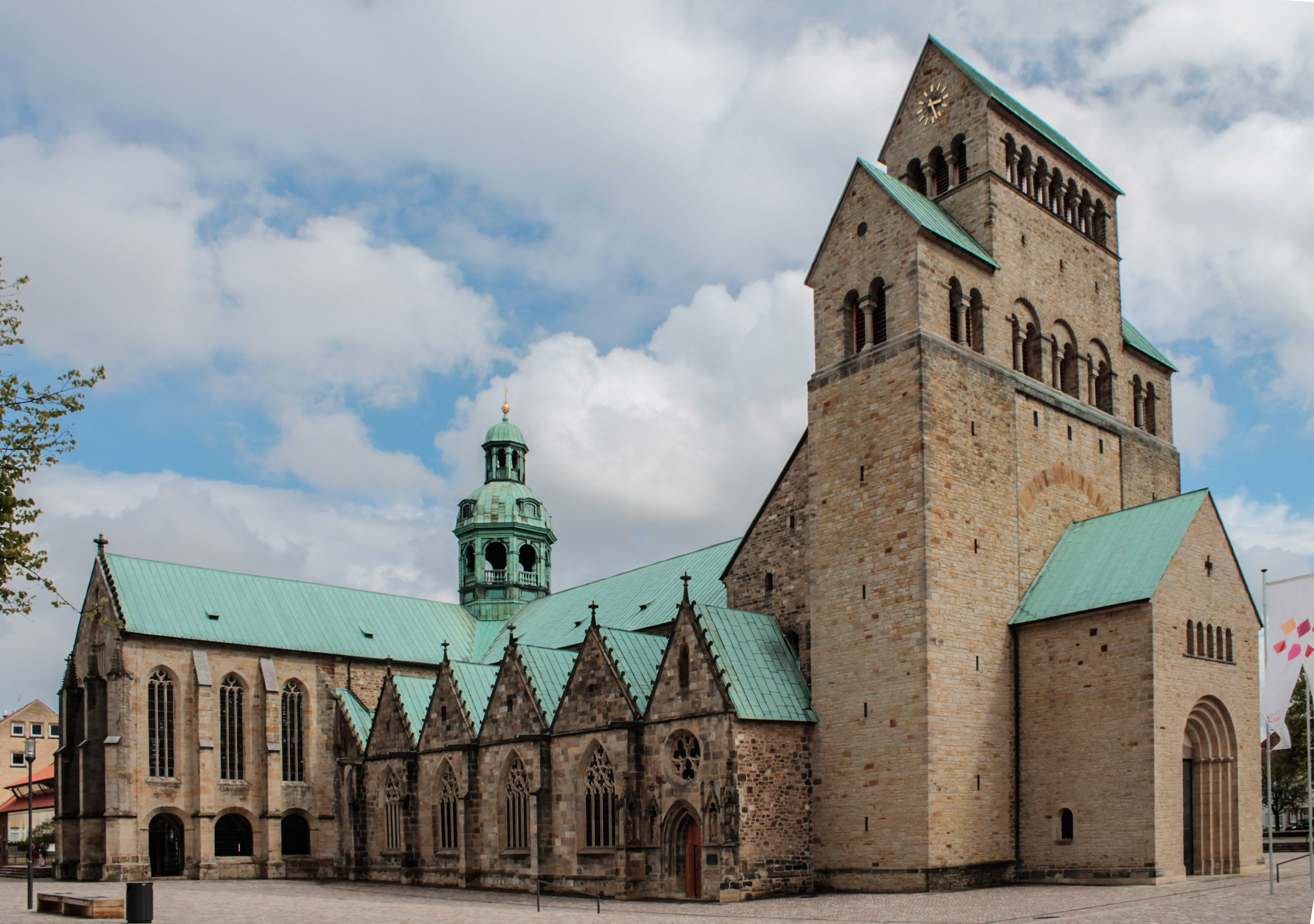
Cathedral of the Assumption of Mary in Hildesheim.

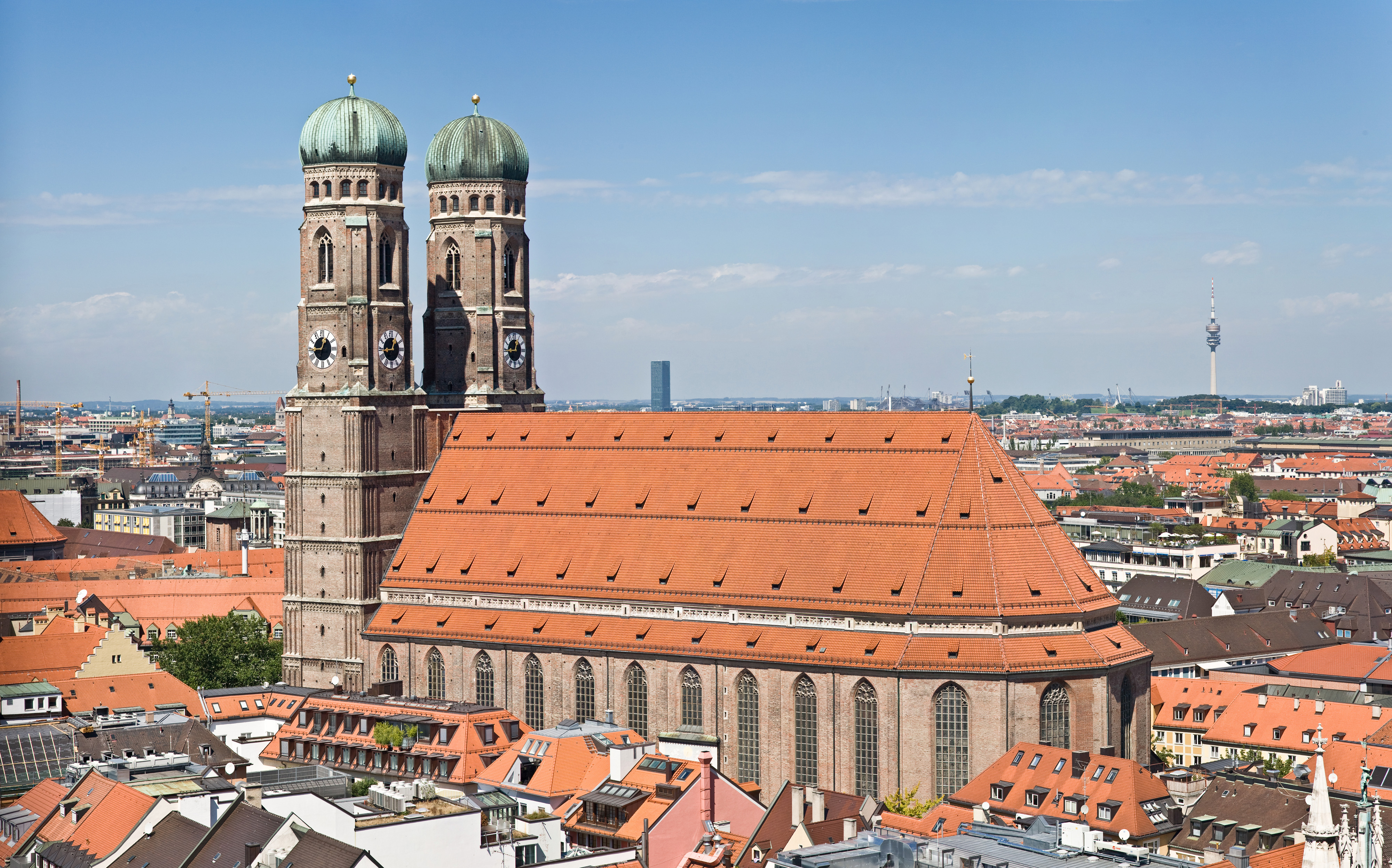
Munich Frauenkirche viewed from nearby St. Peter's Church.

== Catholic Church ==
Cathedrals of the Catholic Church in Germany:

- Imperial Cathedral of Our Lady in Aachen ^{1}
- Cathedral of Our Lady of the Visitation and the Most Sacred Heart of Jesus in Augsburg
  - Co-cathedral Basilica of Sts. Peter and Paul in Dillingen
- Imperial Cathedral of Sts. Peter and Paul and St. George in Bamberg ^{1}
- Cathedral Basilica of St. Hedwig in Berlin
- Cathedral of the Holy Trinity in Dresden
  - Co-cathedral of St. Peter in Bautzen
- Cathedral of Our Lady of Assumption in Eichstätt
- Cathedral of St. Mary in Erfurt
- Cathedral of the Holy Trinity, Sts. Mary, Cosmas and Damian in Essen
- Cathedral of Our Lady in Freiburg
- Cathedral of Christ the Saviour in Fulda
- Cathedral of St. James in Görlitz
- Cathedral of St. Mary in Hamburg
- Cathedral of the Assumption of Mary in Hildesheim ^{1}
- Basilica of St. John the Baptist Patron of Breslavia in Berlin (of the Military Ordinariate of Germany)
- Cathedral of St. Peter in Cologne ^{1}
- Cathedral of St. George and St. Nicholas in Limburg an der Lahn
- Cathedral of St. Sebastian in Magdeburg
- Imperial Cathedral of St. Martin of Tours and St. Stephen in Mainz
- Cathedral of Our Lady in Munich
  - Co-Cathedral of Our Lady's Nativity, Sts. Corbinian, Lantpert, Nonnosus and Sigismund in Freising
- Cathedral of the Intercession of the Mother of God and of St. Andrew in Munich (of the Ukrainian Catholic Apostolic Exarchate of Germany and Scandinavia)
- Cathedral of St. Paul in Münster
- Cathedral of St. Peter in Osnabrück
- Cathedral of Sts. Mary, Kilian and Liborius in Paderborn
- Cathedral of St. Stephen in Passau
- Cathedral of St. Peter in Regensburg ^{1}
- Cathedral of St. Martin in Rottenburg
  - Co-cathedral Church of St. Eberhard in Stuttgart
- Imperial Cathedral Basilica of Our Lady of the Assumption and St. Stephen in Speyer ^{1}
- Cathedral of St. Peter in Trier ^{1}
- Cathedral of Sts. Kilian, Colonat and Totnan in Würzburg

^{1} World Heritage Site in Germany

== Protestant Church in Germany cathedrals ==
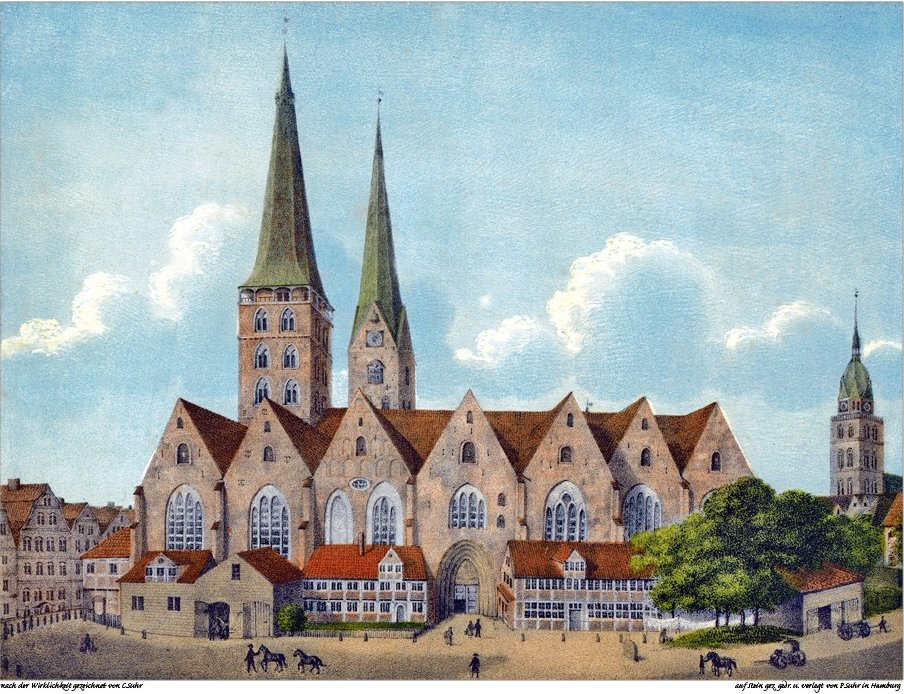
St. Mary's Cathedral, Hamburg, seen from south against the towers of St. Peter (centre) and St. James (right). Lithography by Peter Suhr, 19th century.

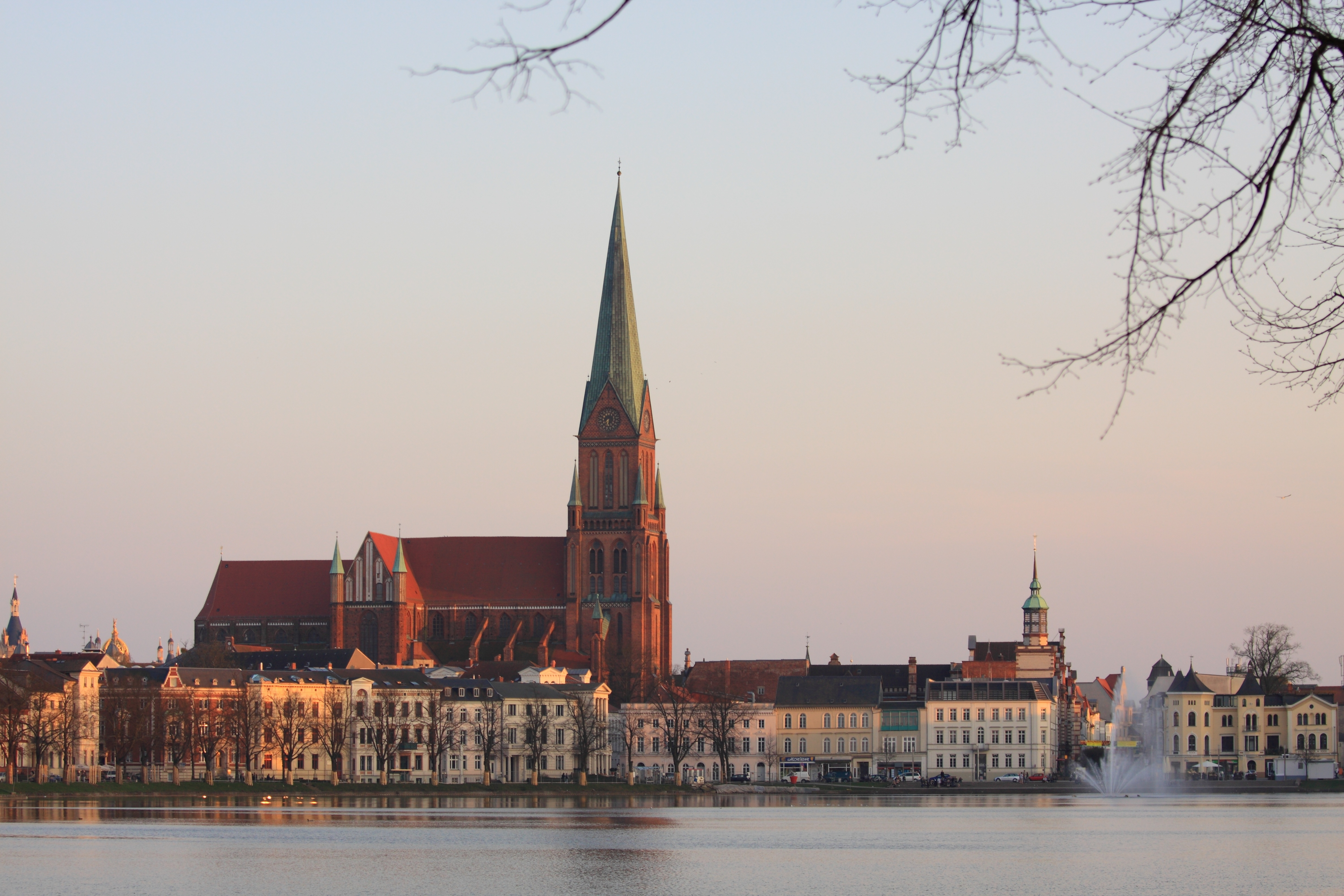
Schwerin Cathedral, along with St. Mary's Church, Lübeck and St. Nicholas' Church, Stralsund, it is one of the earliest large examples of Brick Gothic architecture.

Protestant Church in Germany cathedrals in Germany:

- St. Peter and Paul Cathedral, Brandenburg, Brandenburg an der Havel - formerly the seat of the Prince-Bishop of the Diocese of Brandenburg
- Cathedral of Ss. Blaise and John the Baptist, Braunschweig
- Cathedral Church of St. Peter, Bremen - formerly the seat of the Prince-Archbishop of the Prince-Archbishopric of Bremen
- Cathedral Church of St. Mary, Fürstenwalde - formerly the seat of the Bishop of the Diocese of Lebus
- Church of St Stephen and St Sixtus, Halberstadt - formerly the seat of the Bishop of the Diocese of Halberstadt
- St Mary's Cathedral, Havelberg - formerly the seat of the Bishop of the Diocese of Havelberg
- St. Mary's Cathedral, Hamburg - formerly one of the seats of the Prince-Archbishop of the Prince-Archbishopric of Bremen
- St. Michael's Church, Hamburg, Hamburg
- Market Church of Ss. George and James, Hanover
- Cathedral Church of Ss. John the Baptist, Blaise, Mary and Nicholas, Lübeck ^{1} - formerly the seat of the Prince-Bishop of the Prince-Bishopric of Lübeck
- Imperial Cathedral Church of Ss. Maurice and Catherine, Magdeburg - formerly the seat of the Archbishop of the Diocese of Magdeburg
- Cathedral Church of St. John, Mainz - the seat of the Archbishop of the Archdiocese of Mainz until 975.
- Meissen Cathedral or Church of St John and St Donatus, Meissen - formerly the seat of the Bishop of the Diocese of Meissen
- Merseburg Cathedral or Dom St. Johannes und St. Laurentius, Merseburg - formerly the seat of the Bishop of the Diocese of Merseburg
- Cathedral Church of Ss. Peter and Paul, Naumburg ^{1} - formerly the seat of the Bishop of the Diocese of Naumburg
- St Mary and St John the Evangelist Cathedral, Ratzeburg - formerly the seat of the Bishop of the Diocese of Ratzeburg
- Cathedral of St. Peter at Schleswig, Schleswig - formerly the seat of the Bishop of the Diocese of Schleswig
- Schwerin Cathedral, Schwerin - formerly the seat of the Bishop of the Diocese of Schwerin
- Stiftskirche, Stuttgart, Stuttgart
- Cathedral of St. Mary and St. Cecilia, Verden - formerly the seat of the Bishop of the Diocese of Verden

== Eastern Orthodox ==
Eastern Orthodox cathedrals in Germany:

- Resurrection of Christ Cathedral in Berlin (Russian Orthodox)
- St. Boris Cathedral in Berlin (Bulgarian Orthodox)
- Hagia Trias Metropolitan Cathedral in Bonn (Greek Orthodox Patriarchate of Constantinople)
- St. Mary's Dormition Cathedral in Himmelsthür, Hildesheim (Serbian Orthodox)
- Metropolitan Cathedral in Nuremberg (Romanian Orthodox)

^{1} World Heritage Site in Germany

== See also ==
- Lists of cathedrals by country
- Imperial Cathedrals
