= Euroea =

Euroea or Eurœa (or Eurea) may refer to:

- Euroea (Epirus), ancient city and bishopric in Epirus, Greece
- Euroea (Phoenicia) (or Evaria), ancient city and bishopric in modern Syria
