= Diocese of Rottenburg-Stuttgart =

Catholic diocese in Germany

Diocese of Rottenburg-Stuttgart Dioecesis Rottenburgensis-Stutgardiensis Diözese Rottenburg-Stuttgart

Catholic
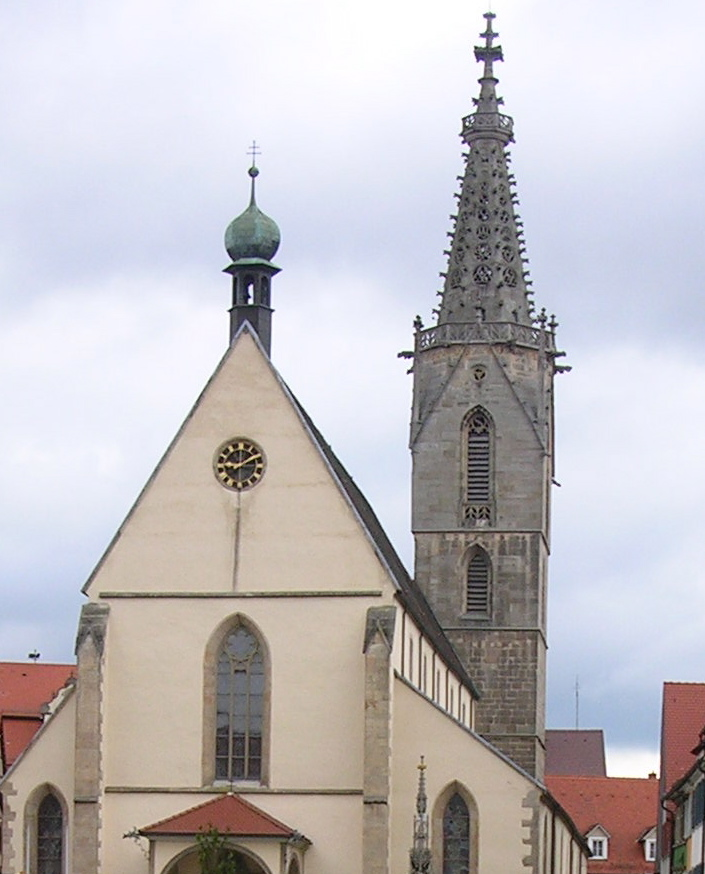
- Rottenburg Cathedral

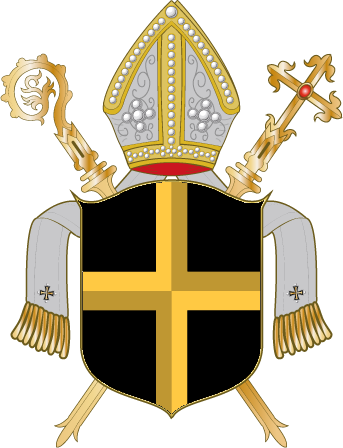
- Coat of arms

Location
- Country: Germany
- Ecclesiastical province: Freiburg
- Metropolitan: Archdiocese of Freiburg

Statistics
- Area: 19,514 km^{2} (7,534 sq mi)
- Population: Total; Catholics: (as of 2010); 5,064,000; 1,921,236 (37.9%)
- Parishes: 1,037

Information
- Denomination: Catholic
- Sui iuris church: Latin Church
- Rite: Roman Rite
- Established: 16 August 1821
- Cathedral: St. Martin's Cathedral, Rottenburg
- Co-cathedral: St. Eberhard Co-Cathedral, Stuttgart
- Patron saint: Martin of Tours
- Secular priests: 902

Current leadership
- Pope: Leo XIV
- Bishop: Klaus Krämer
- Metropolitan Archbishop: Archbishop of Freiburg
- Auxiliary Bishops: Thomas Maria Renz, Gerhard Schneider, Matthäus Karrer
- Vicar General: Clemens Stroppel
- Bishops emeritus: Gebhard Fürst

Map
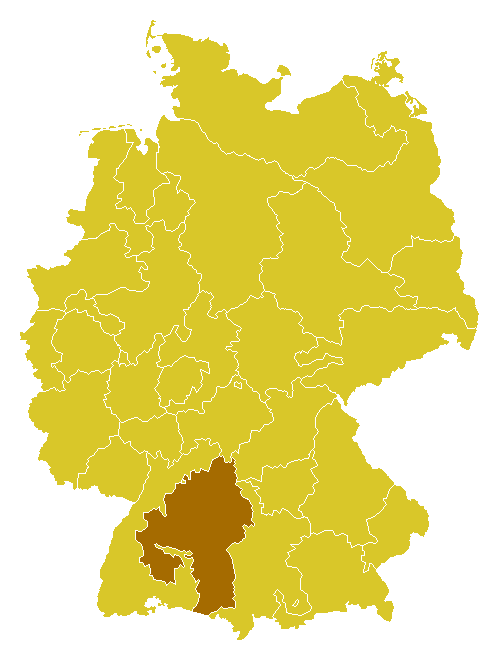

Website
- drs.de

The Diocese of Rottenburg-Stuttgart is a Latin Church ecclesiastical territory or diocese of the Catholic Church in Germany. It is a suffragan in the ecclesiastical province of the metropolitan Archdiocese of Freiburg in Baden-Württemberg, Bundesland. It covers the same territory of the former Kingdom of Wurttemberg.

== History ==
- In 1803 a Vicar General for the "New" State of Wurttemberg was appointed by Prince Primate Karl Theodor von Dalberg as an auxiliary bishop (Franz Karl Joseph Fürst von Hohenlohe-Waldenburg-Schillingsfürst, he consecrated the current Co-Cathedral in Stuttgart, later became Bishop of Augsburg). The first see of the vicariate was in Ellwangen Abbey but in 1817 it moved to Rottenburg.
- The Diocese of Rottenburg was established on 16 August 1821 through the papal bull De salute animarum, on territory separated from the suppressed Diocese of Konstanz. With the enthronement of the first bishop, Johann Baptist von Keller, on May 20, 1828, the formation of the diocese was complete.
- On 18 January 1978, the diocese was renamed to the current title Diocese of Rottenburg-Stuttgart.

== Major churches ==
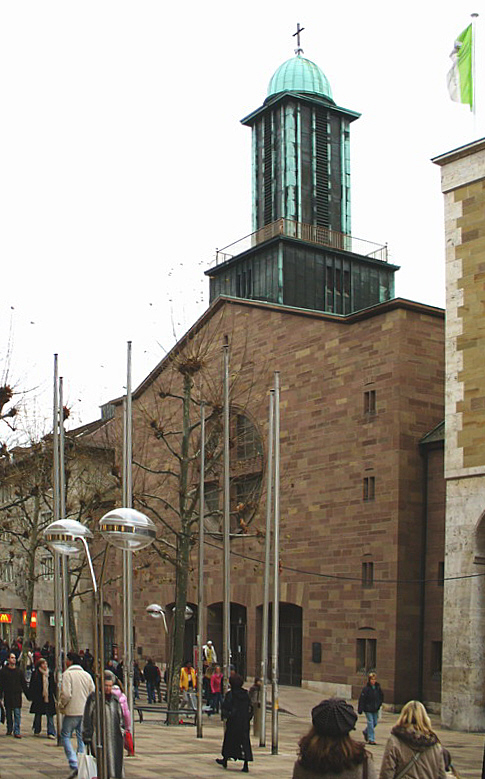
St. Eberhard's Co-Cathedral, Stuttgart

- The St. Martin's Cathedral is the episcopal see in Rottenburg
- The Co-cathedral is St. Eberhard in Stuttgart
- It also has three minor basilicas :
  - the former Cathedral of Ellwangen Abbey (ex territorial abbey), Basilika St. Vitus, in Ellwangen, first seat of the General Vicar of Wurttemberg
  - Basilika St. Martin, in Ulm's Benedictine Wiblingen Abbey
  - Basilika St. Martin von Tours und St. Oswald, in Weingarten, Württemberg.
- Another World Heritage Site (originally Catholic, later Lutheran seminary and school) is the former Cistercian monastery Kloster Maulbronn, in Maulbronn.

== Episcopal ordinaries ==
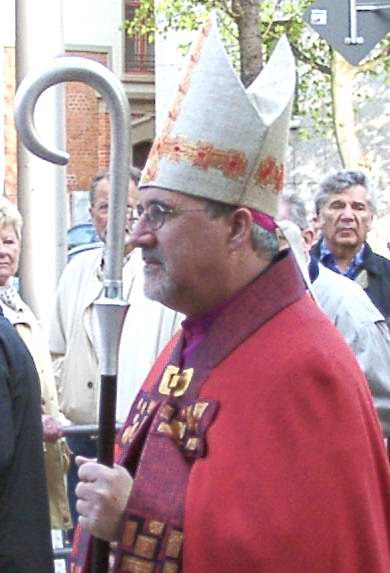
Bishop Gebhard Fürst 2004 in Stuttgart-Bad Cannstatt

(all Roman Rite)

=== Suffragan Bishops of Rottenburg ===
- Johann Baptist von Keller January 28, 1828 – death October 17, 1845; previously Auxiliary Bishop of Augsburg (Germany) (1816.06.15 – 1828.01.28) and Titular Bishop of Evaria (1816.07.22 – 1828.01.28)
- Josef von Lipp June 14, 1847 – death May 3, 1869
- Karl Joseph von Hefele June 17, 1869 – death June 5, 1893
- Wilhelm von Reiser June 5, 1893 – death May 11, 1898; succeeded as former Titular Bishop of Ænos (1886.08.31 – 1893.06.05) and Coadjutor Bishop of Rottenburg (1886.08.31 – 1893.06.05)
- Father Franz Xaver von Linsenmann July 20, 1898 – September 21, 1898; never consecrated Bishop
- Paul Wilhelm von Keppler November 11, 1898 – death July 16, 1926
- Johannes Baptista Sproll March 29, 1927 – death March 4, 1949; succeeded as former Titular Bishop of Halmyrus (1916.03.03 – 1927.03.29) and Auxiliary Bishop of Rottenburg (1916.03.03 – 1927.03.29)
  - Auxiliary Bishop: Franz Joseph Fischer (1929.12.19 – death 1958.07.24), Titular Bishop of Zuri (1929.12.19 – 1958.07.24)
- Carl Joseph Leiprecht July 4, 1949 – retired June 4, 1974, previously Titular Bishop of Scyrus (1948.10.07 – 1949.07.04) as Auxiliary Bishop of Rottenburg (1948.10.07 – 1949.07.04); died 1981
  - Auxiliary Bishop: Wilhelm Sedlmeier (1953.02.07 – retired 1976), Titular Bishop of Aulon (1953.02.07 – death 1987.02.24)
  - Auxiliary Bishop: Anton Herre (1970.10.12 – retired 1985.12.31), Titular Bishop of Galazia in Campania (1970.10.12 – death 1993.09.24)

=== Suffragan Bishops of Rottenburg-Stuttgart ===
- Georg Moser March 12, 1975 – death May 9, 1988; previously Titular Bishop of Thiges (1970.10.12 – 1975.03.12) as Auxiliary Bishop of Rottenburg (1970.10.12 – 1975.03.12)
  - Auxiliary Bishop: Franz Josef Kuhnle ((1976.10.13 – retired 1990.11.07), Titular Bishop of Sorres (1976.10.13 – ...)
  - Auxiliary Bishop: Bernhard Rieger (1984.12.20 – retired 1996.07.31), Titular Bishop of Tigava (1984.12.20 – death 2013.04.10)
- Walter Kasper April 17, 1989 – retired May 31, 1999; also Secretary of Pontifical Council for Promoting Christian Unity (1999.03.16 – 2001.02.21), created Cardinal-Deacon of Ognissanti in Via Appia Nuova (2001.02.21 [2001.03.25] – 2011.02.21), President of Pontifical Council for Promoting Christian Unity (2001.03.03 – 2010.07.01), President of Commission for Religious Relations with the Jews (2001.03.03 – 2010.07.01), promoted Cardinal-Priest of above Ognissanti in Via Appia Nuova as pro hac vice Title (2011.02.21 – ...)
  - Auxiliary Bishop: Johannes Kreidler (1991.06.06 – retired 2017.03.02), Titular Bishop of Edistiana (1991.06.06 – ...)
  - Auxiliary Bishop: Thomas Maria Renz (1997.04.29 – ...), Titular Bishop of Rucuma (1997.04.29 – ...)
- Gebhard Fürst July 7, 2000 – retired December 4, 2023
  - Auxiliary Bishop: Matthäus Karrer (2017.03.02 – ...), Titular Bishop of Tunnuna (2017.03.02 – ...)
  - Auxiliary Bishop: Gerhard Schneider (2019.04.16 – ...), Titular Bishop of Abbir Germaniciana (2019.04.16 – ...)
- Klaus Krämer October 2, 2024 - …

== Statistics and extent ==
The Diocese of Rottenburg-Stuttgart is located in the Württemberg part of the German State of Baden-Württemberg. As per 2014, it pastorally served 1,872,849 Catholics (37.0% of 5,068,000 total) on 19,500 km^{2} in 1,096 parishes and 40 missions with 1,016 priests (829 diocesan, 187 religious), 283 deacons, 3,368 lay religious (228 brothers, 3,140 sisters) and 26 seminarians.

=== Deaneries ===
It comprises 45 deaneries :

- Aalen
- Backnang
- Balingen
- Biberach
- Böblingen
- Calw
- Ehingen
- Ellwangen
- Esslingen-Nürtingen
- Freudenstadt
- Friedrichshafen
- Geislingen
- Göppingen
- Heidenheim
- Heilbronn
- Hohenlohe
- Laupheim
- Leutkirch
- Ludwigsburg
- Mergentheim
- Mühlacker
- Neckarsulm
- Neresheim
- Oberndorf
- Ochsenhausen
- Ravensburg
- Reutlingen
- Riedlingen
- Rottenburg am Neckar
- Rottweil
- Saulgau
- Schwäbisch Gmünd
- Schwäbisch Hall
- Spaichingen
- Stuttgart-Bad Cannstatt
- Stuttgart-Filder
- Stuttgart-Mitte (centre)
- Stuttgart-Nord (north)
- Tuttlingen
- Ulm
- Waiblingen
- Waldsee
- Wangen
- Zwiefalten

== See also ==
- List of Catholic dioceses in Germany

== Sources and external links ==
- (in German) Diocesan website
- GCatholic.org
- Herbermann, Charles, ed. (1913). "Rottenburg" . Catholic Encyclopedia. New York: Robert Appleton Company.
- Some information in this article is based on that in its German equivalent.
