= Cartennae =

Ancient city in Mauretania Caesariensis

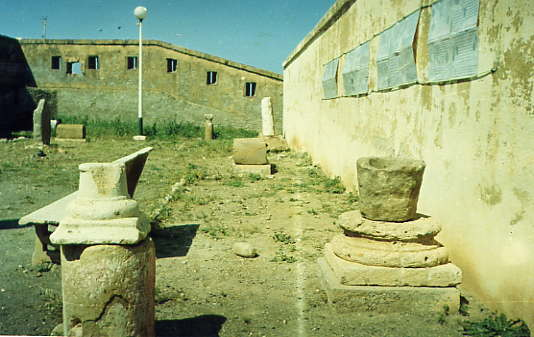
- Ruins of Roman Cartennae

- Location within Algeria
- 36°31′00″N 1°19′00″E
- Location: Algeria
- Region: Chlef Province

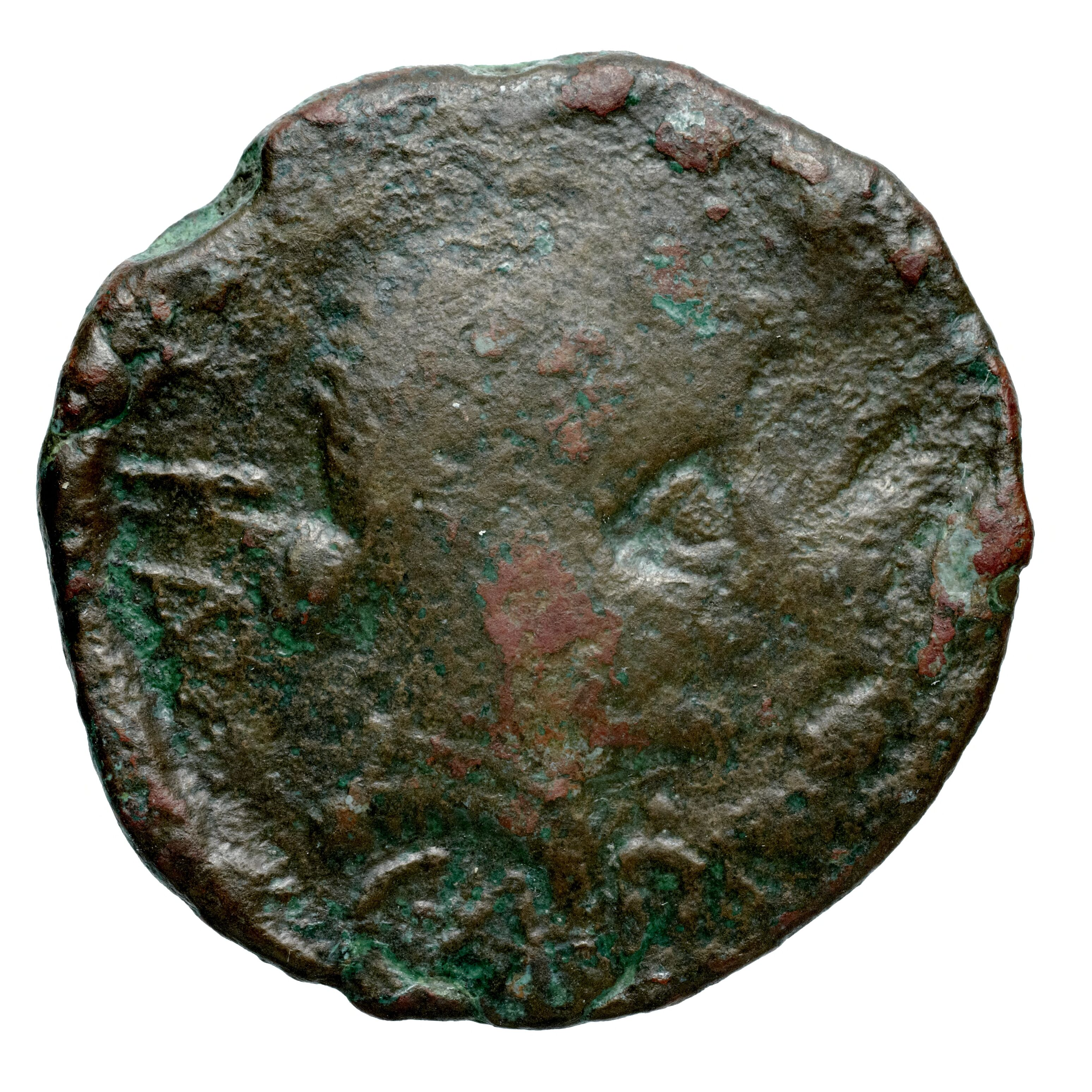
A coin of Cartenna

Cartennae or Cartenna was an ancient Carthaginian and Roman port at present-day Ténès, Algeria. Under the Romans, it was part of the province of Mauretania Caesariensis.

== Name ==
Cartenna's name was variously recorded by the Greeks as Karténna (Ancient Greek: Καρτέννα), Kártina (Κάρτινα), Kártinna (Κάρτιννα), and Karténnai (Ancient Greek: Καρτένναι). It was usually Latinized as Cartennae or Cartenna, but appears as Cartinna in Mela. These names seem to combine the Punic word for "city" (qrt) with a Berber placename element (-tn), also seen in the Phoenician names for Cirta, Tipasa, and Sabratha. The name does not derive from the river (Note: As, for example, asserted by MacBean.) but from nearby Cape Tenes. The plural form Cartennae seems to allude to a second Berber settlement that existed 1.5 km (1 mi) upstream. Notionally refounded as a Roman colony, it was also known as Colonia Augusti after its imperial patron.

== History ==
=== Phoenician colony ===
Cartennae was established as a Phoenician colony by the 8th century BC. It lay at the mouth of the Wadi Allala (the classical Cartennus). In addition to trading in the usual ivory, hides, and cedar of the interior, Cartennae was apparently the site of an important copper mine. Like other colonies in the western Mediterranean, Cartennae eventually fell under Carthaginian control.

=== Roman colony ===
After the Punic Wars, Cartennae was dominated by the Romans. The first emperor Augustus established a colony of veterans from the 2nd Legion there in 30 BC and the city started to grow in importance. Augustus even founded in what is now coastal Algeria the following Roman colonies: Igilgili, Saldae, Tubusuctu, Rusazu, Rusguniae, Aquae Calidae, Zuccabar and Gunugu. All these colonies were connected to Cartennae in a military way with strong commercial links.

Tenes is supposed to have been a Phoenician settlement, and was a place of great importance during the Roman occupation, under the name of Cartenna. When Marshal Bugeaud fixed on this spot to establish a French colony, a fine monument, the remains of the ramparts, and other ruins, were standing, but I understand that none are now in existence, except the foundations of the ramparts beneath the present town walls, and the cisterns now utilised by the French. An interesting monumental inscription now in Algiers, records that the Roman governor, Caius Fulcinius Optatus, successfully defended the colony against an attack by the Baquates, the Bakoutai of the Greeks, doubtless the wild Highlanders of the circumjacent Dahra. This tribe is specially mentioned by Pliny. Cartenna was rendered famous in the theological disputes which shook the African Christian Church to its centre. Rogatus, Donatist Bishop of Cartenna, established a new sect, modifying the Donatist heresy, and his followers were denominated Rogatists, after their founder. During the revolts of Firmus, who was subdued by Theodosius in 371, and by Gildo in 396, Rogatus took advantage of the general confusion to persecute his opponents; but his Sect did not take firm root, and during the episcopacy of Vincentius, his successor, only two African bishops were tainted with this particular heresy. Though all memorials of the Romans above ground at Tenes have been destroyed—by the Vandals, according to the French—a large portion of the old necropolis has been brought to light by the falling away of part of the cliff, probably during an earthquake. From the deck of the ship the tombs were quite perceptible, and the dark recesses ran some distance along the hill-side, sometimes assuming the form of galleries, along which no doubt vaults branched off on either side. Many of these vaults are used by the Government as magazines and cellars, and I heard that skeletons, and even pieces of clothing and jewelry, had been found in their recesses. At the other extremity of the bay I saw some remains of masonry, which probably mark the site of the Roman port.

During the centuries of Roman domination Cartennae was a rich city with a forum, theater, baths, library and aqueducts, but it was devastated during the revolt of Firmus in the years 372–375.

Despite the continuation of its name in modern Ténès, identification of the site was long delayed by misinformation in surviving geographical accounts of Roman North Africa, including Ptolemy the Antonine Itineraries. Distances in the gazetteers were apparently thrown off by Ptolemy's misreckoning of longitude and by the lack of Roman roads in the area, requiring distances to be estimated by sailors. The French first confused Cartennae with Mostaganem, 50 km (31 mi) to the west, but the discovery of epitaphs a few years later in Ténès helped solve the mistake. A necropolis has been excavated and formerly served as a public park.

=== Later history ===
Cartennae was sacked by the Vandals during their 5th-century invasion of Roman North Africa and presumably reconquered by the Byzantines during their resumption of control over the area. It was almost entirely destroyed following the conquest of the area by the Umayyad Caliphate. The bleakness of its situation militated against resettlement; medieval Tenes was a separate settlement about 3.2 km (2 mi) away, settled by Spaniards in the 9th century.

Following the town's surrender to the invading French in 1843, the former site of Cartennae became the center of the new French town established in 1847.

== Religion ==
Cartennae was a Christian bishopric in antiquity and the early medieval period and was reëstablished as a Catholic titular see in the 20th century.

The earliest known bishops of Cartennae were Rogatus (from whom came the name "Rogatism") and Vincentius, who espoused the belief that the church should not use force to compel orthodox belief; their arguments survive only in the form of St Augustine's invective against them. Other known bishops are Rusticus, who in 418 assisted at the disputation between Saint Augustine and the Donatist Emeritus in Caesarea in Mauretania; Victor, a contemporary of Gaiseric (and therefore of the mid-5th century) and the author of several works; and Lucidus, one of the Catholic bishops whom Huneric summoned to Carthage in 484 and then exiled.

== See also ==
- Mauretania Caesariensis
- Caesarea of Mauretania
