= German Cathedral =

German Cathedral may refer to:

- German Cathedral, Berlin, which is not a cathedral in the formal sense of the word
- List of cathedrals in Germany
