= Franz Josef Kuhnle =

German priest and theologian (1926–2021)

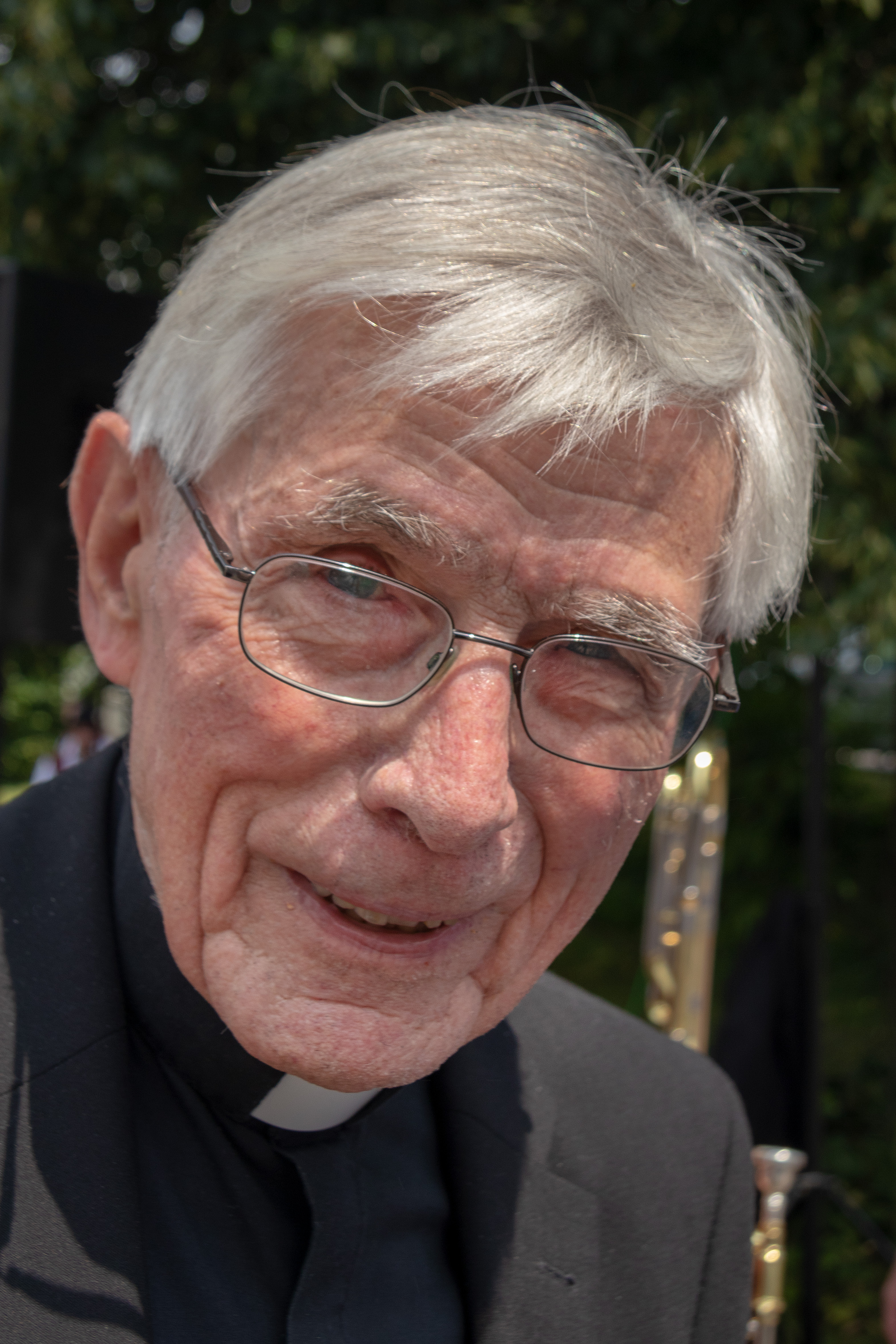
Kuhnle in 2018

Franz Josef Kuhnle (27 April 1926 – 4 February 2021) was a German Catholic auxiliary bishop.

Kuhnle was born in Germany and was ordained to the priesthood in 1952. He served as titular bishop of Sorres and as auxiliary bishop of the Diocese of Rottenburg-Stuttgart, West Germany, from 1976 to 1990.
