= Victor of Tunnuna =

6th-century North African bishop and martyr

Victor of Tunnuna (Latin Victor Tunnunensis) (died c. 570) was Bishop of the North African town of Tunnuna and a chronicler from Late antiquity. He was also considered a martyr by Isidore of Seville.

Victor supported of the Three Chapters and the endangered Chalcedonian Orthodoxy against the religious policies of Justinian I. He was punished with imprisonment within a monastery in Mandracium, then exiled to the Balearic Islands. The prisoner was eventually transferred to Canopus. In the mid-560s, Justin II imprisoned Victor in Constantinople itself. He is thought to have died while still confined within a monastery in Constantinople.

== Life ==
The only source on Victor's life is his own chronicle. Victor was a staunch supporter of the Three Chapters which had been condemned by Justinian's edict of 544, and on this account he was arrested. His unrestrained emotions and vivid allegiance to his defense of the endangered Chalcedonian Orthodoxy showed his willingness to refuse the emperor's demands. He was relentlessly critical of those who submitted to the emperor and refused to withstand persecution for their stance on the Three Chapters. His first imprisonment was a monastery in Mandracium near Carthage, followed by exile to the Balearic Islands and finally transferred to Egypt to a monastery in Canopus. In 564 or 565 he and five other African bishops were summoned before Emperor Justin II and Patriarch Eutychius in Constantinople. When they refused to submit to the emperor's edict, they were imprisoned in different monasteries throughout Constantinople. Victor died about 569, most likely still confined at the monastery in Constantinople.

== Works ==
Victor is the fifth author and continuator of the chronicle, the Chronicon, started by Sextus Julius Africanus (c. 160 - 240), which was continued by Eusebius (c. 260/5 - 339/40) Jerome (c. 347 - 420), and Prosper of Aquitaine (c. 390 - 455). It runs from the creation of the world to the end of the year 566 and Victor wrote it largely while in confinement. Only the part extending from 444 to 566 is extant. It is of great historical value, dealing chiefly with the Eutychian heresy, the controversy about the Three Chapters, and providing details concerning the Arians and the invasion of the Vandals. In general, church matters receive more attention than other issues in this chronicle. It was continued to 590 by John of Biclaro, founder of the Abbey of Biclar in Visigothic Hispania on the Iberian Peninsula, comprising modern Spain and Portugal and followed at greater length by Isidore of Seville through 616.

Victor has been credited with being the author of the pseudo-Ambrosian De Poenitentia, although Victor of Cartenna seems to be the real author.

The Chronicon (444-566) is available in an English translation by John R. C. Martyn under the title Arians and Vandals of the 4th-6th Centuries.
