= Tunnuna =

Tunnuna was an ancient city and diocese in Roman Africa. It is now a Latin Catholic titular see.

== History ==
Tunnuna was located in modern Tunisia. It was important enough in Roman-era province of Africa Proconsularis to become one of the many suffragans of the capital Carthage's Metropolitan Archbishopric, but faded like most.

== Titular see ==
The diocese was nominally restored in 1933 as Titular bishopric of Tunnuna (Latin and Curiate Italian) / Tunnunen(sis) (Latin adjective).

It has had the following incumbents, so far of the fitting Episcopal (lowest) rank :

- George John Rehring (1967.02.25 – resigned 1970.12.31) as emeritate, formerly Titular Bishop of Lunda (1937.08.06 – 1950.07.16) as Auxiliary Bishop of Archdiocese of Cincinnati (USA) (1937.08.06 – 1950.07.16), Bishop of Toledo (USA) (1950.07.16 – retired 1967.02.25); died 1976
- Urbano José Allgayer (1974.02.05 – 1982.02.04) as Auxiliary Bishop of Archdiocese of Porto Alegre (Brazil) (1974.02.05 – 1982.02.04), next Bishop of Passo Fundo (Brazil) (1982.02.04 – retired 1999.05.19)
- Osvaldo Giuntini (1982.06.25 – 1987.04.30) as Auxiliary Bishop of Diocese of Marília (Brazil) (1982.06.25 – 1987.04.30), next Coadjutor Bishop of Marília (1987.04.30 – 1992.12.09), succeeding as Bishop of Marília (1992.12.09 – retired 2013.05.08)
- Narbal da Costa Stencel (1987.10.30 – death 2003.01.31) as Auxiliary Bishop of Archdiocese of (São Sebastião do) Rio de Janeiro (Brazil) (1987.10.30 – 2002.03.13)
- Edney Gouvêa Mattoso (2005.01.12 – 2010.01.20) as Auxiliary Bishop of Archdiocese of (São Sebastião do) Rio de Janeiro (Brazil) (2005.01.12 – 2010.01.20), next Bishop of Nova Friburgo (Brazil) (2010.01.20 – ...)
- Johannes Wilhelmus Maria Liesen (2010.07.15 – 2011.11.26) as Auxiliary Bishop of Diocese of ’s-Hertogenbosch (Netherlands) (2010.07.15 – 2011.11.26), next Bishop of Breda (Netherlands) (2011.11.26 – ...), also Vice-President of Episcopal Conference of the Netherlands (2016.06.14 – ...)
- Stephen Robson (2012.05.08 – 2013.12.11) as Auxiliary Bishop of Archdiocese of Saint Andrews and Edinburgh (Scotland, UK) (2012.05.08 – 2013.12.11), next Bishop of Dunkeld (Scotland) (2013.12.11 – ...)
- Bishop-elect Matthäus Karrer (2017.03.02 – ...), as Auxiliary Bishop of Diocese of Rottenburg–Stuttgart (southern Germany) (2017.03.02 – ...).

== See also ==
- List of Catholic dioceses in Tunisia
- Victor of Tunnuna

== Sources and external links ==
- GCatholic - data for all sections
