= Victor of Cartenna =

Victor of Cartenna was a 5th-century Christian author from Africa. He was the bishop of Cartenna in the province of Mauretania Caesariensis during the reign of Gaiseric (r. 428–477). Most of his writings are lost and the little that is known about him comes mainly from an entry in Gennadius of Marseille's On Famous Men.

The identification of the works listed by Gennadius with surviving texts is uncertain. Two are definitely lost: a treatise against Arianism, Adversus Arianos, addressed to the Arian king Gaiseric, and a collection of his sermons. A short work of consolation on the death of a son addressed to a certain Basil, Ad Basilium super mortem filii consolatorius libellus, is either lost or else a case of mistaken identity, derived from a misidentification of the treatise De consolatione in adversis as Victor's, since it is variously misattributed in the manuscripts to Victor of Tunnuna and Basil the Great.

The only surviving work that modern scholarship attributes to Victor is a work on penitence, De paenitentia. This work Gennadius refers to as De paenitentia publica. It came to be mistakenly ascibred to Ambrose of Milan and was first published as such. Victor, however, names himself in his closing chapter. Some manuscripts misattribute the work to Victor of Tunnuna. De paenitentia is written in a high literary style of Latin. Victor extensively quotes from Bible, usually from memory, sometimes paraphrastically.

The only English translation of De paenitentia is by John R. C. Martyn.

== Sources ==
- Flower, Richard (2010). "Review of Martyn 2008". The Journal of Ecclesiastical History. 61 (3): 580–581. doi:10.1017/S0022046910000692.
- Martyn, John R. C., ed. (2008). Arians and Vandals of the 4th–6th centuries: Annotated Translations of the Historical Works by Bishops Victor of Vita (Historia persecutionis Africanae provinciae) and Victor of Tonnena (Chronicon), and of the Religious Works by Bishop Victor of Cartenna (De paenitentia) and Saints Ambrose (De fide orthodoxa contra Arianos), and Athanasius (Expositio fidei). Cambridge Scholars Publishing.
- Tommasi, Chiara Ombretta (2013). "Victor of Cartenna". In Karla Pollmann; Willemien Otten (eds.). The Oxford Guide to the Historical Reception of Augustine. Oxford University Press.
