= Rogatists =

4th-5th century pacifist Donatists

The Rogatists were a religious movement within early Christianity that separated in the 4th century from the Donatists over the use of violence in the church. Much of what we know about the Rogatists comes from the writings of Augustine, against both them and the Donatists.

Rogatus, Donatist Bishop of Cartenna, in Mauretania Caesariensis established a new sect, modifying Donatist ideas, for a less extreme and Pacifist formate. His followers were denominated Rogatists, after him. Rogatus was replaced by Vincentius.

== Beliefs ==
The schism in the Donatist church in the 360s arose over the use of violence in the church with the Rogatists claiming, "No one should be compelled to follow righteousness."

Augustine countered saying that he too had thought that way but was convinced of the need for compulsion by the success of the imperial laws, and that Vincentius would use force if he had the power to do so. Augustine tried to show from the scripture that the use of force could be shown.

Augustine also wrote that the Donatists returned to the Catholic church with "thanks they would not be offering willingly, had they not first, even against their will been severed from that impious association", arguing a familiar line that coercion was beneficial for the recipient.

Later Augustine wrote The nature and origin of the Soul to address the teachings of Vincent Victor, a Rogatist disciple of Vincentius. In 407 Vincent Victor had written to Augustine appealing to him to not persecute the Rogatist congregations.

Augustine wrote back

... you certainly seem to us less fierce, since you do not run wild in savage bands of Circumcellions, but no wild animal is called tame if it injures no one because it lacks teeth or claws. You say you do not want to act savagely; I suspect that you cannot...

He also cited that the Rogatists had sought court action for return of their churches seized by Donatists, to which Vincent Victor replied they were only seeking return of their goods and "not to accuse someone in order that he might be coerced" into conversion.

Their key tenets of belief were:

- a commitment to absolute pacificism
- a commitment to sacramental and personal purity.
