= Paul Wilhelm von Keppler =

German Catholic prelate

His Excellency, The Most Reverend Paul Wilhelm von Keppler
- Bishop of Rottenburg
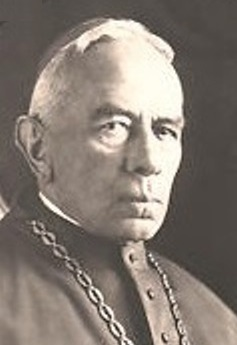
- Diocese: Rottenburg
- Successor: Joannes Baptista Sproll

Orders
- Ordination: 2 August 1874
- Consecration: 18 January 1899 by Thomas Nörber

Personal details
- Born: 28 September 1852 Schwäbisch Gmünd, Kingdom of Württemberg
- Died: 16 July 1926 (aged 73) Rottenburg am Neckar, Weimar Republic
- Denomination: Roman Catholic Church

Paul Wilhelm von Keppler (28 September 1852 – 16 July 1926) was a German Catholic prelate and theologian who served as the 6th Bishop of the Diocese of Rottenburg.
