= Krumbad =

- Native name: Heilbad Krumbad GMBH
- Industry: Spa
- Founded: 1418
- Headquarters: Bischof-Sproll-Strasse 1, 86381 Krumbad, Germany
- Website: www.krumbad.de

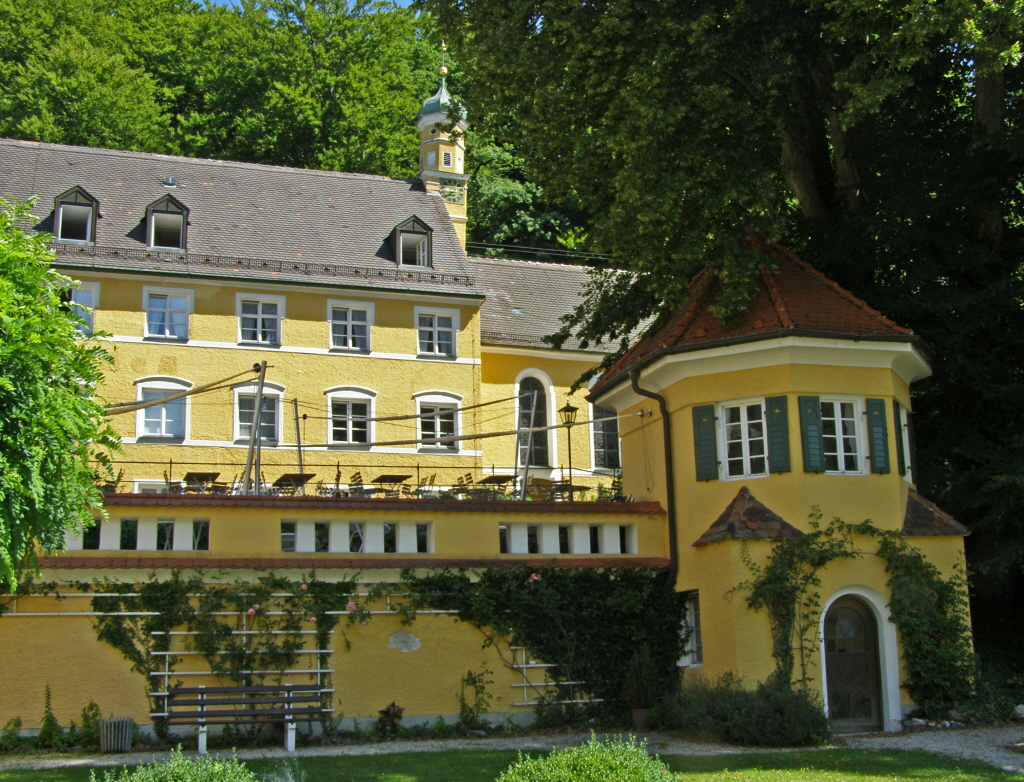
Spa Krumbad

Krumbad is a traditional spa in Swabia, Germany. It has over 600 years of tradition, and it is located at the foot of Alps.

== History ==
Hiltipold von Krumbenbach built a castle in 1145 on the mountain of today's Krumbades and named it after his name "Hiltipoldsburg", in the folk music "Hilpelsberg". Hiltipoldsburg and Hürben (now the eastern part of Krumbach) came to the knights of Ellerbach some time later, who also brought Krumbach to themselves.

== See also ==
- List of oldest companies
- Krumbach, Bavaria
