= List of Catholic dioceses in Germany =

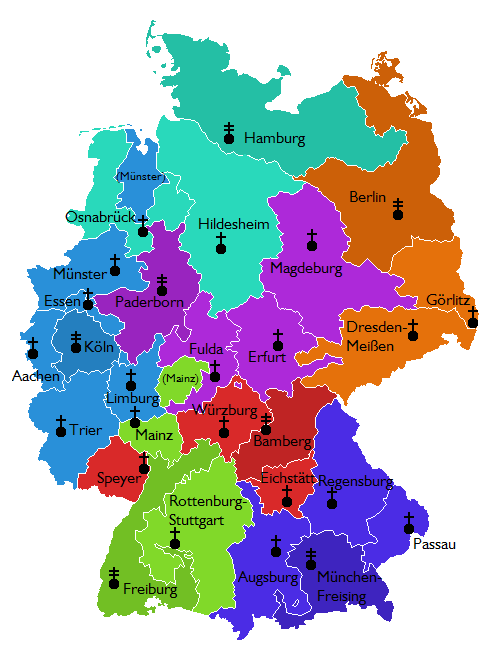

The Catholic Church in Germany comprises 7 ecclesiastical provinces each headed by an archbishop. The provinces are in turn subdivided into 20 dioceses and 7 archdioceses each headed by a bishop or an archbishop.

== List of dioceses ==
=== Episcopal Conference of Germany ===
- Ukrainian Catholic Apostolic Exarchate of Germany and Scandinavia

==== Ecclesiastical province of Bamberg ====
- Archdiocese of Bamberg
  - Diocese of Eichstätt
  - Diocese of Speyer
  - Diocese of Würzburg

==== Ecclesiastical province of Berlin ====
- Archdiocese of Berlin
  - Diocese of Dresden-Meissen
  - Diocese of Görlitz

==== Ecclesiastical province of Cologne ====
Alternative name: Rhenish Ecclesiastical Province

- Archdiocese of Cologne
  - Diocese of Aachen
  - Diocese of Essen
  - Diocese of Limburg
  - Diocese of Münster
  - Diocese of Trier

==== Ecclesiastical province of Freiburg im Breisgau ====
Alternative name: Upper Rhenish Ecclesiastical Province

- Archdiocese of Freiburg im Breisgau
  - Diocese of Mainz
  - Diocese of Rottenburg-Stuttgart

==== Ecclesiastical province of Hamburg ====
Alternative name: Northern German Ecclesiastical Province

- Archdiocese of Hamburg
  - Diocese of Hildesheim
  - Diocese of Osnabrück

==== Ecclesiastical province of Munich and Freising ====
- Archdiocese of Munich and Freising
  - Diocese of Augsburg
  - Diocese of Passau
  - Diocese of Regensburg

==== Ecclesiastical province of Paderborn ====
Alternative name: Central German Ecclesiastical Province

- Archdiocese of Paderborn
  - Diocese of Erfurt
  - Diocese of Fulda
  - Diocese of Magdeburg

== Gallery of Archdioceses ==
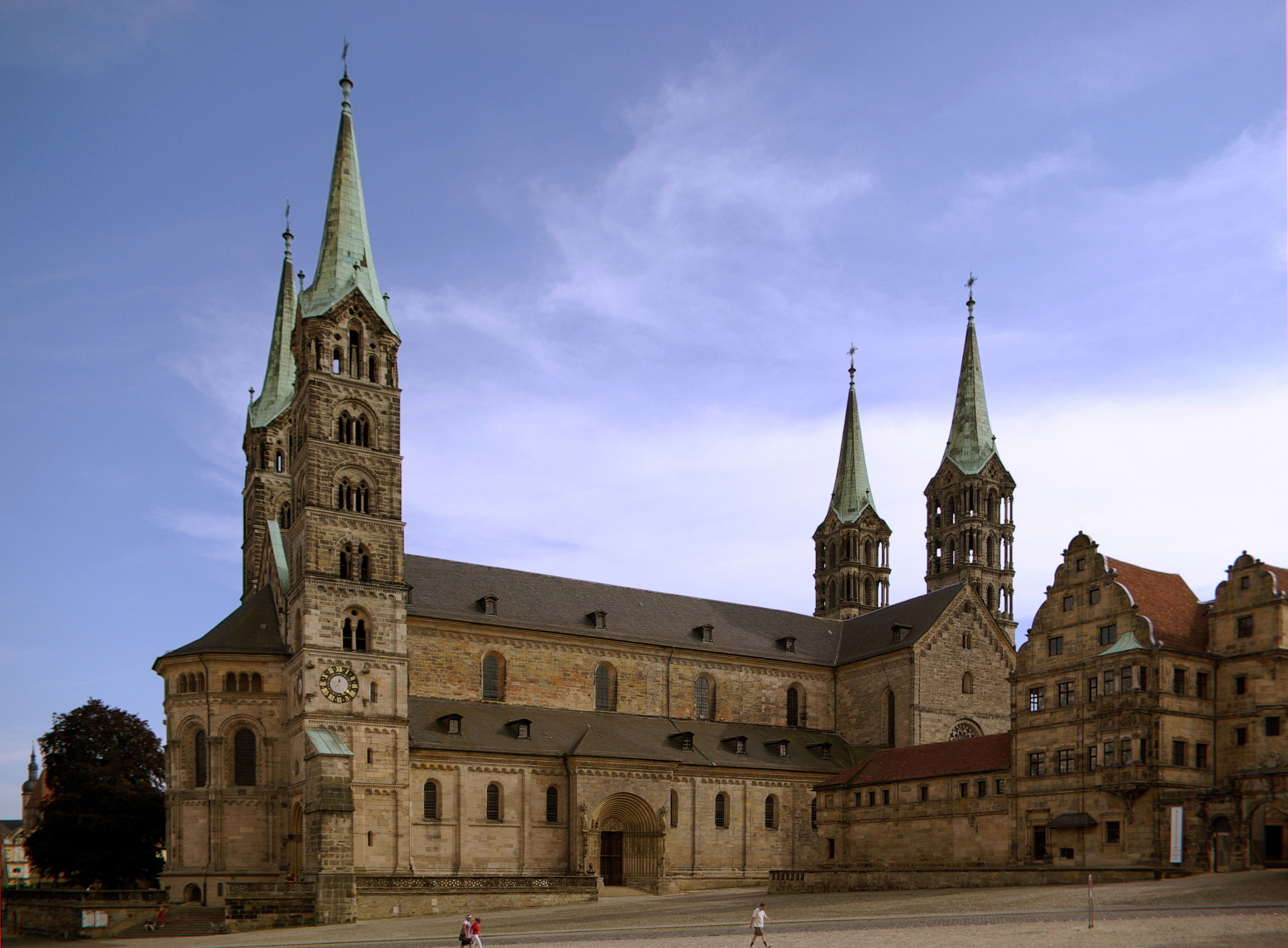
The seat of the Archdiocese of Bamberg is Imperial Cathedral of Sts. Peter and Paul and St. George.

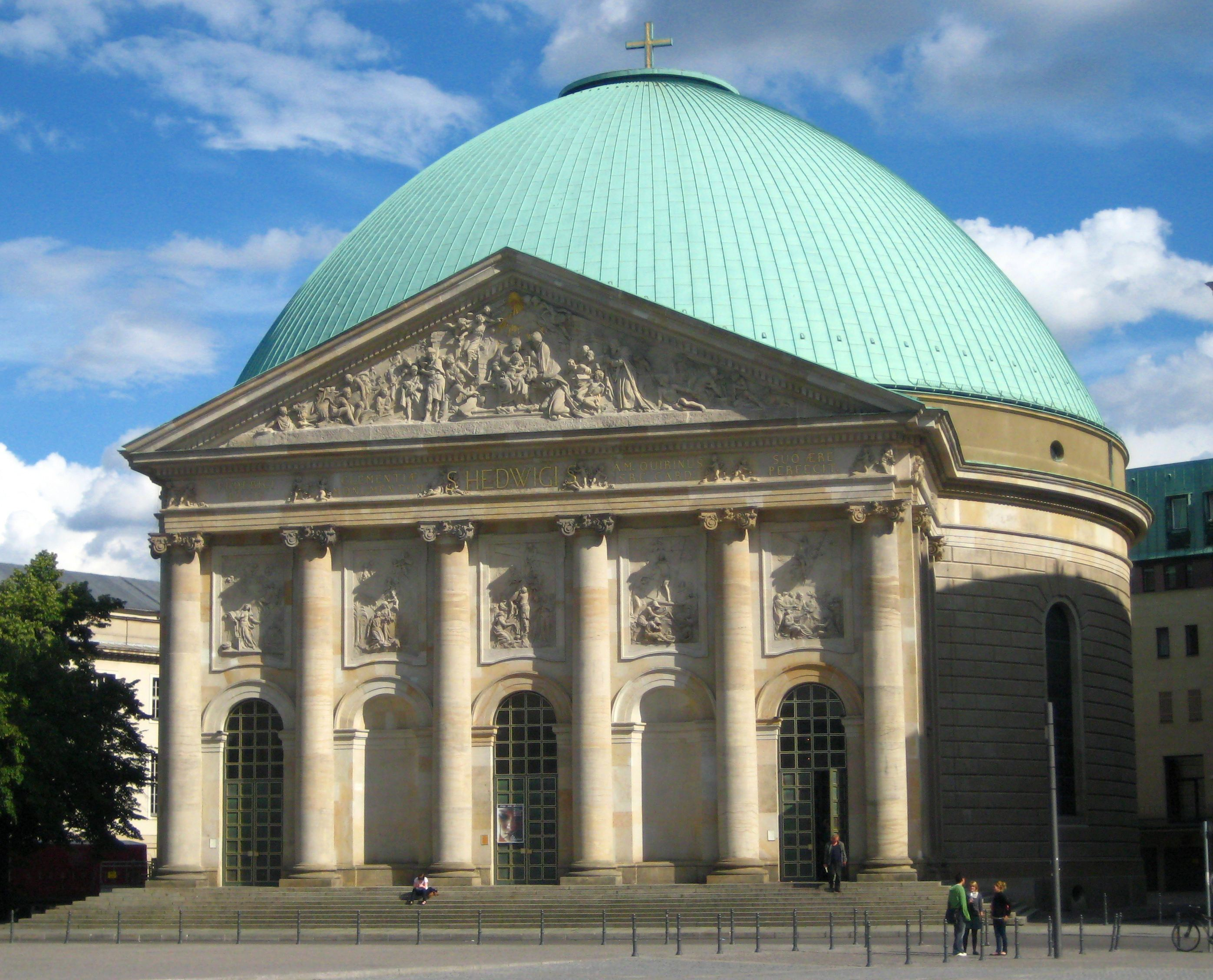
The seat of the Archdiocese of Berlin is St. Hedwig's Cathedral.

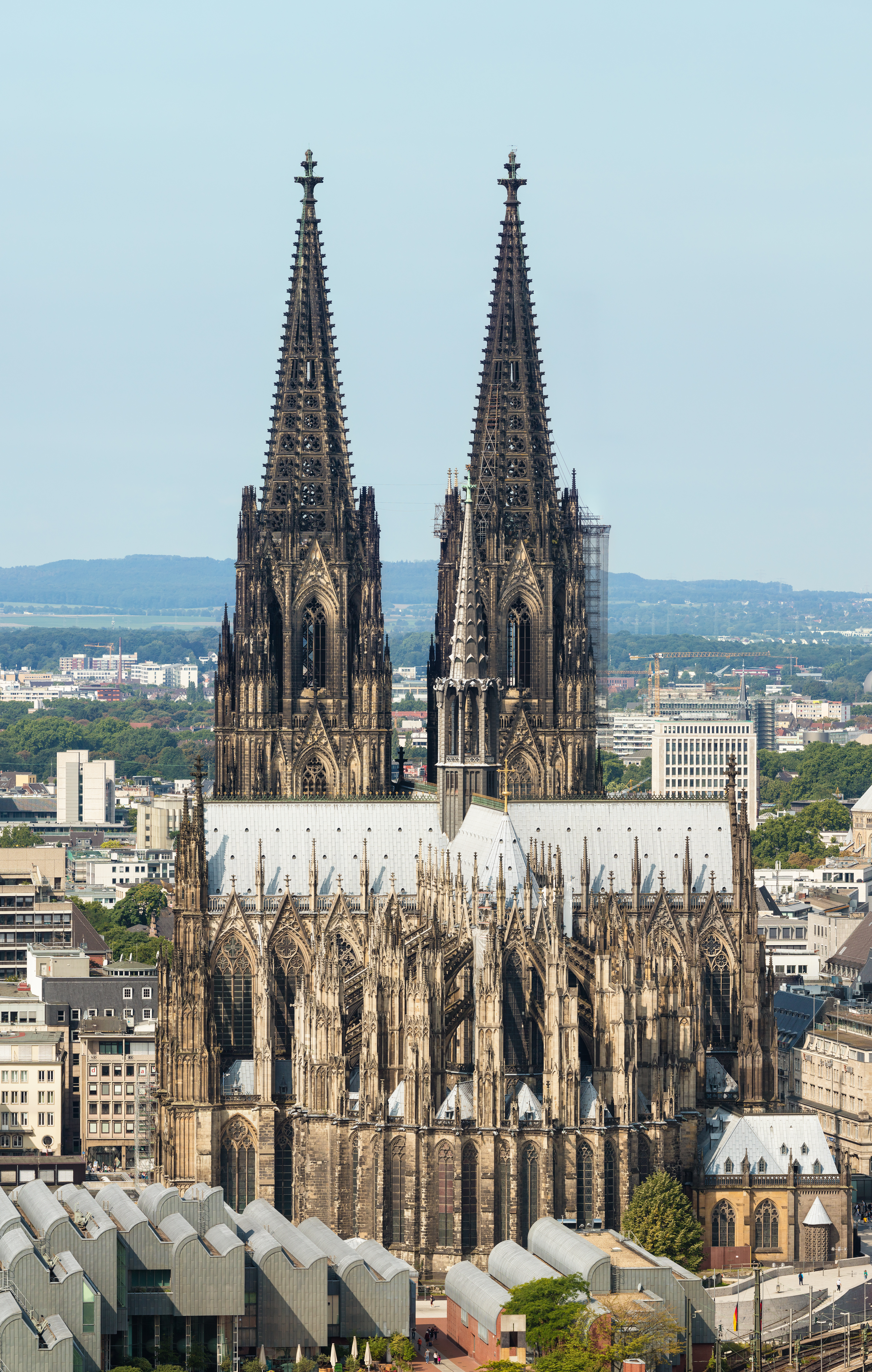
The seat of the Archdiocese of Cologne is Cathedral of Sts. Peter and Mary.

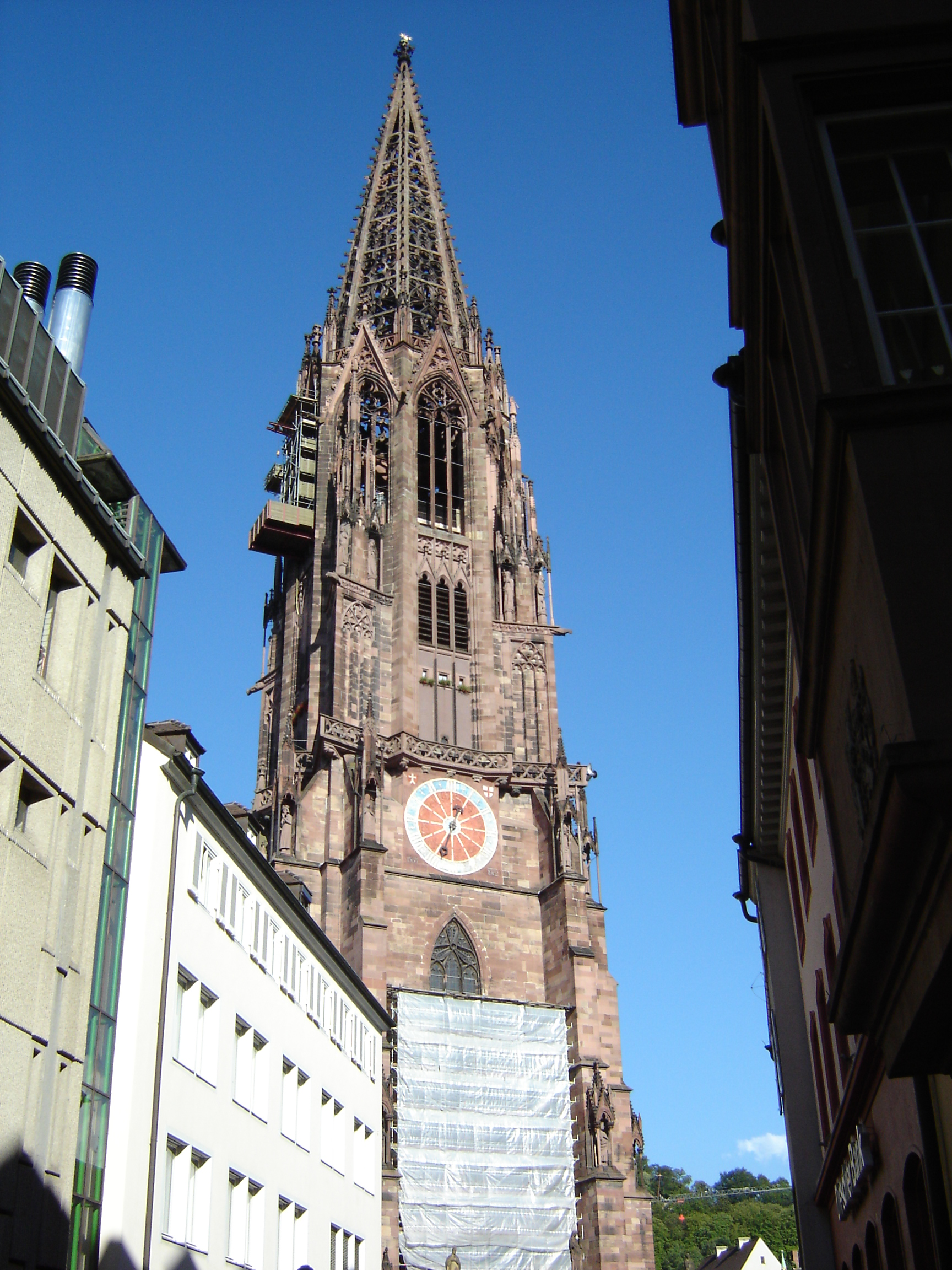
The seat of the Archdiocese of Freiburg is Cathedral of Our Lady.

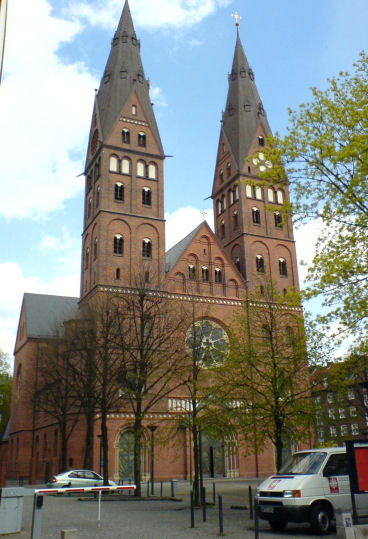
The seat of the Archdiocese of Hamburg is Cathedral of St. Mary.

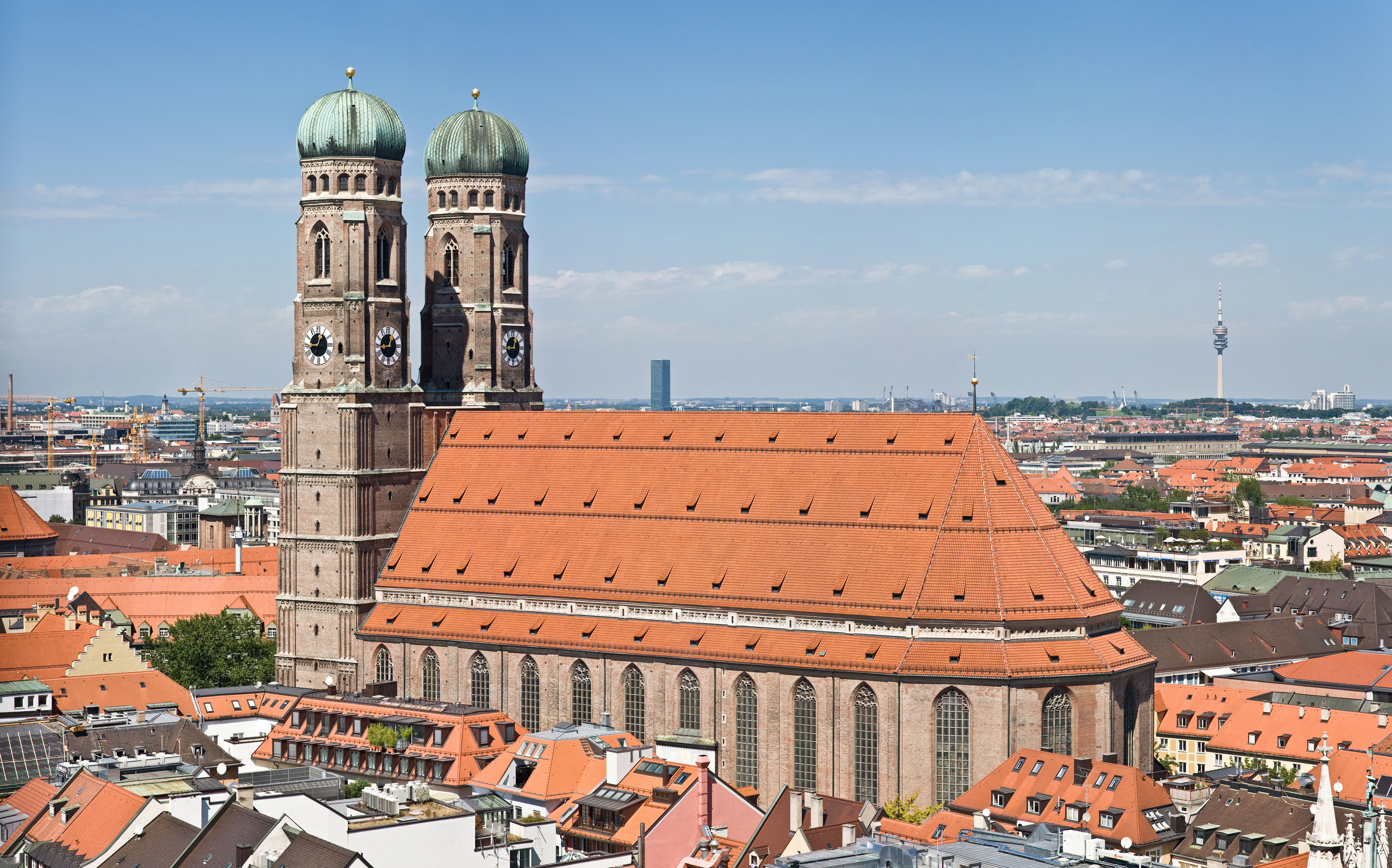
The seat of the Archdiocese of Munich and Freising is Cathedral of Our Lady.

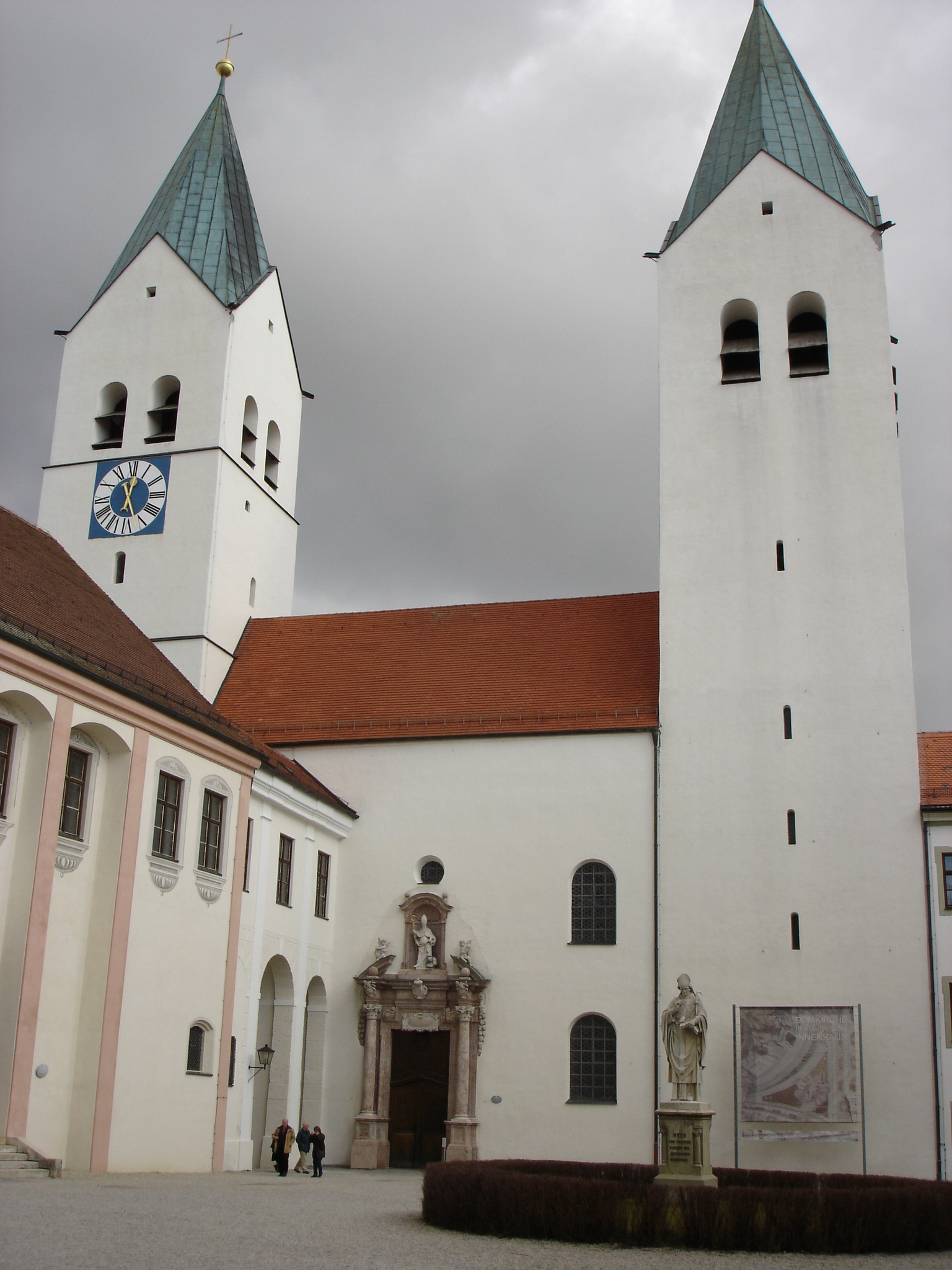
The co-seat of the Archdiocese of Munich and Freising is Cathedral of Our Lady’s Nativity, Sts. Corbinian, Lantpert, Nonnosus, and Sigismund.

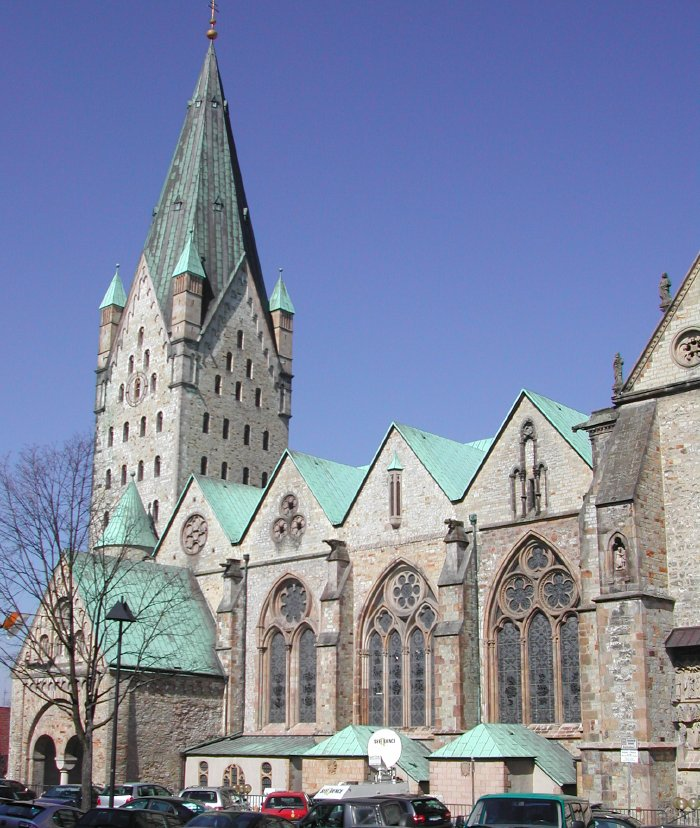
The seat of the Archdiocese of Paderborn is Cathedral of Sts. Mary, Liborius and Kilian.

== See also ==
- List of Roman Catholic dioceses in Germany between 1821 and 1993
