= Johann Baptist von Keller =

German Catholic priest

- Bishop of Rottenburg
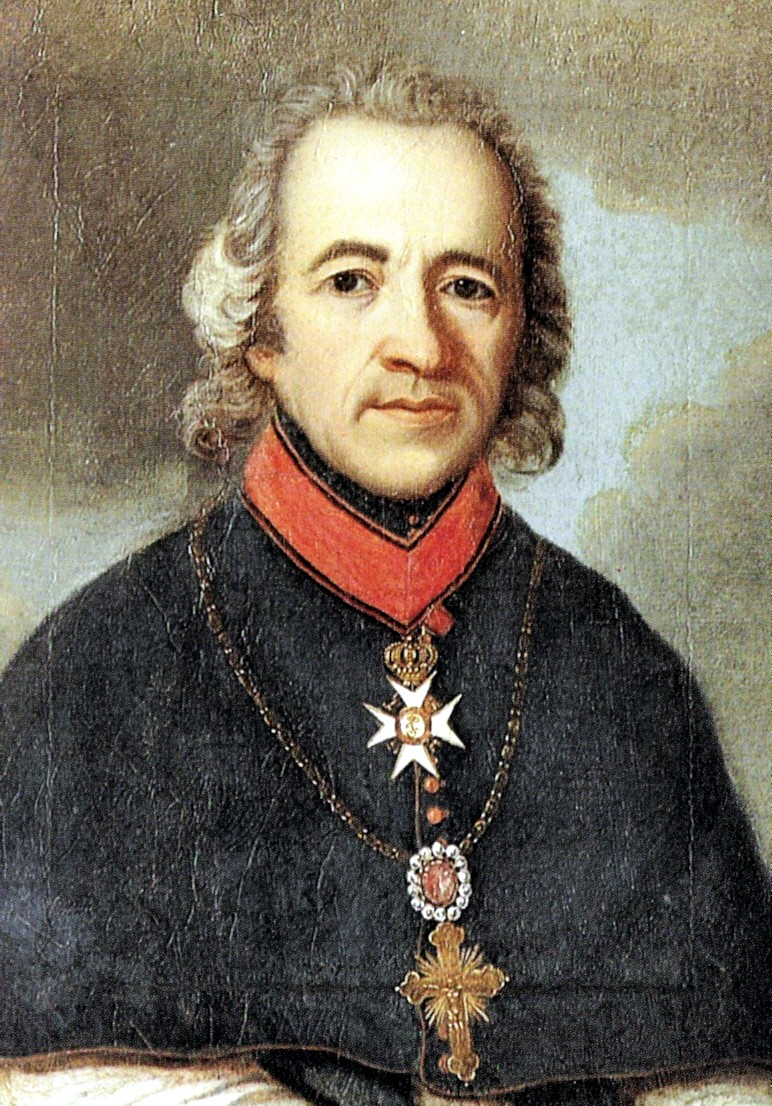
- Church: Catholic Church
- Diocese: Diocese of Rottenburg
- In office: 28 January 1828 – 17 October 1845
- Predecessor: Diocese established
- Successor: Josef von Lipp
- Previous posts: Titular Bishop of Evaria (1816-1828); Auxiliary Bishop of Augsburg (1816-1828)

Orders
- Ordination: 10 June 1797
- Consecration: 4 August 1816 by Pope Pius VII

Personal details
- Born: 16 May 1774 Imperial Abbey of Salem, Swabian Circle, Holy Roman Empire
- Died: 17 October 1845 (aged 71) Schrozberg, Kingdom of Württemberg, German Confederation

Johann Baptist von Keller (16 May 1774 – 17 October 1845) was a German Catholic priest from Salem. He served as the first Bishop of Rottenburg.

Keller was consecrated a priest in 1797 and was called to Württemberg in 1808. In 1816, he was made Auxiliary Bishop of Augsburg and Titular Bishop of Evaria by Pope Pius VII. This consecration was done by the Pope himself.

Keller became the Vicar General of Rottenburg in 1819. The Diocese of Rottenburg was created in 1821, and Keller was made its first bishop in 1828. He died in 1845 in Schrozberg.

Preceded by —	Bishop of Rottenburg; 1828—1845	Succeeded by Josef von Lipp
