= Rottenburg Cathedral =

- St. Martin's Cathedral of Rottenburg
- German: Dom St. Martin
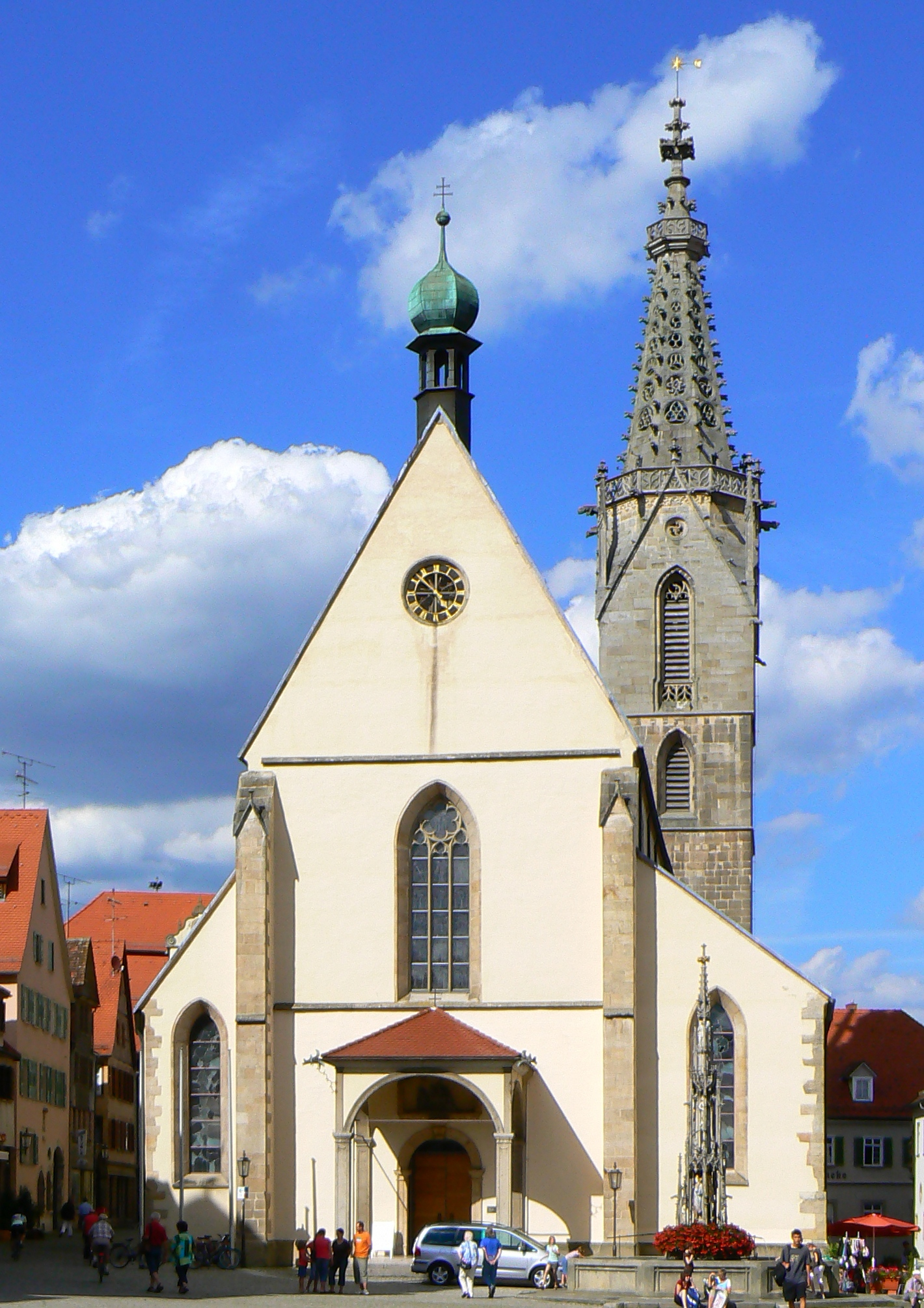
- Rottenburg Cathedral

- Location within Baden-Württemberg
- 48°28′38.6″N 8°56′2.8″E
- Location: Rottenburg am Neckar
- Country: Germany
- Denomination: Roman Catholic
- Website: www.dom-st-martin.e2make.de

History
- Status: Cathedral
- Dedication: Martin of Tours

Administration
- Archdiocese: Freiburg
- Diocese: Rottenburg-Stuttgart

Rottenburg Cathedral, also known as St. Martin's Cathedral (German: Dom St. Martin), is a Roman Catholic cathedral in Rottenburg am Neckar, Germany dedicated to Martin of Tours. It is the seat of the Diocese of Rottenburg-Stuttgart.

== History ==
A chapel was built here in 1280; the parish church of the village of Sülchen was established before the village was incorporated into the city, and was dedicated to St. Martin. A fire in 1644 was followed by a fundamental reconstruction which was completed on 8 September 1655. The reconstruction made the building into a Baroque church, the pillars were strengthened and the vault was repaired. The asymmetric plan was preserved.

Known in German as Dom St. Martin it has been the city's cathedral since 1821. Its tower, dating from 1486, is its most prominent feature.

== Bells ==
No.	Name	Dated	Founder	Diameter (mm)	Weight (kg)	Pitch
1	Martinusglocke	2008	Glockengießerei Bachert, Karlsruhe	1990	4800	a^{0}
2	Zwölfuhrglocke	1649	H. und Cl. Rosier, Rottenburg	1550	2350	c^{1}
3	Franziskusglocke	1953	E. Gebhard, Kempten	1390	1650	d^{1}
4	Elfeglock oder Wetterglocke	1649	Cl. Rosier, Rottenburg	1250	1100	e^{1}
5	Salveglocke	1649	Cl. Rosier, Rottenburg	1070	650	g^{1}
6	Marienglocke	2008	Glockengießerei Bachert, Karlsruhe	980	550	a^{1}
7	Evangelistenglocke	1649	Cl. Rosier, Rottenburg	820	320	h^{1}
8	Sterbe-/Totenglocke	1737	N. Rosier, Rottenburg	590	115	e^{2}
9	Ziehglöckle	1627	Fr. Racle, Rottenburg	470	70	a^{2}
10	Neuneglöckle	1744	A. Lindner, Esslingen	400	47	c^{3}
11	Kreuzglöckle	1645	Rosier, Rottenburg	330	21	cis^{3}
I	Sakristeiglocke (Martinus)	2004	Glockengießerei Bachert, Karlsruhe	180	10	c^{4}
