= Euroea in Phoenicia =

Ancient city and bishopric in modern Syria, now a Latin Catholic titular see

Euroea in Phoenicia (also spelled Eurœa in Phœnicia) was a city in the late Roman province of Phoenicia Secunda. today Hawarin, north of al-Qaryatayn and on the road from Damascus to Palmyra. A former bishopric, it remains a Latin Catholic titular see.

== History ==
The true name of this city seems to have been Hawârin; as such it appears in a Syriac inscription of the fourth to the sixth century. According to Ptolemy it was situated in the Palmyrene province. Georgius Cyprius calls it Euarios or Justinianopolis.

There are ruins of a Roman castellum and of a basilica.

== Bishopric ==
The Notitiae episcopatuum of the Patriarchate of Antioch (6th century) gives Euroea as a suffragan see of the archdiocese of Damascus. One of its bishops, Thomas, is known in 451; there is some uncertainty about another, John, who lived a little later.

Euroea is included in the Catholic Church's list of titular sees. The diocese was nominally restored as a Latin titular bishopric in 1737 as Evaria, which name was changed to Euhara in 1925, Euaria in 1929 and finally Euroea in Phoenicia in 1933.

=== Titular bishops ===
It is vacant, having had the following incumbents, of the lowest (episcopal) rank with a single intermediary-rank (archiepiscopal) exception:

- Titular Bishop Hernando Eusebio Oscot y Colombres, Dominican Order (O.P.) (1737.10.01 – 1743.11.28)
- Titular Bishop Franciszek Kazimierz Dowgiałło Zawisza (1744.04.13 – 1766)
- Titular Bishop Antonius Urbański (1769.09.11 – 1770)
- Titular Bishop Józef Ignacy Rybiński (1774.02.28 – 1777.06.23)
- Titular Bishop Antoni Narzymski (1778.07.20 – 1799.12.10)
- Titular Bishop Nikolaus Rauscher (1808.03.16 – 1815)
- Titular Bishop Johann Baptist Judas Thaddeus von Keller (1816.07.22 – 1828.01.28)
- Titular Bishop Johann Amberg (1865.09.25 – 1882.03.16)
- Titular Bishop José Joaquín Isaza Ruiz (1869.11.22 – 1873.03.29)
- Titular Bishop, Bishop-elect Paul-François-Marie Goethals, Jesuits (S.J.) (1878.01.15 – 1878.02.03), Apostolic Vicar of Western Bengal (India) (1877.12.03 – 1886.09.01); later Titular Archbishop of Hierapolis (1878.02.03 – 1886.09.01), finally Metropolitan Archbishop of Calcutta (India) (1886.09.01 – 1901.07.04)
- Titular Bishop Jean-Pierre Boyer (1878.07.15 – 1879.12.24), later Cardinal-Priest of SS. Trinità al Monte Pincio
- Titular Bishop Raffaele Mezzetti (1880.08.20 – 1881)
- Titular Archbishop Thomas Hyland, O.P. (1882.03.10 – 1884.10.09)
- Titular Bishop Johann Zobl (1885.03.27 – 1907.09.13)
- Titular Bishop Jan Feliks Cieplak (1908.07.12 – 1919.03.28), Auxiliary Bishop of Mohilev (Belarus) (1908.07.12 – 1925.12.14), became Titular Archbishop of Acrida (1919.03.28 – 1925.12.14); also Apostolic Administrator of the above Mohilev (Belarus) (1923.07.05 – 1925.12.14), later Metropolitan Archbishop of Vilnius (Lithuania) (1925.12.14 – 1926.02.17)
- Titular Bishop Antonio Maria Capettini (康道華), Pontifical Institute for Foreign Missions (P.I.M.E.) (1919.04.07 – 1958.07.06)
- Titular Bishop Edoardo Piana Agostinetti (1958.07.21 – 1976.01.14)
