= Tubusuctu =

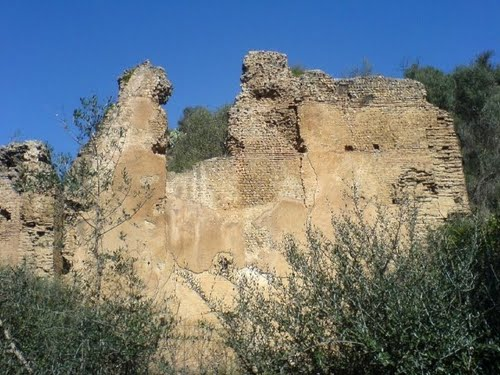
Roman ruins of Tubusuptu, at Tiklat, El Kseur

Tubusuctu also known as Colonia Iulia Augusta Legionis VII, was a Roman colony founded by Augustus for military veterans and known for its olive oil.

== Location ==
The town is located at 36.667565, 4.8462225 near El Kseur, Kabylia and flourished from 330 BC - AD 640.

The town lies in a valley on the left bank of the Soummam, occupying an eminence and the plain running along it on S and E, where there are still vestiges of ramparts. The ruins have suffered from the cultivation of the region. To the S of the eminence are important baths, 50 m square in plan. To the N, in the center of the ruins, and to the E are the remains of immense cisterns. The N cisterns, fed by an aqueduct coming from the W, measure 35.5 x 77 m and are made up of 15 connected basins; the vaults were semicircular in section and there were interior and exterior buttresses. The ruins of the E cistern, fed by an aqueduct leading from the S, crossing the river via a bridge now gone, are confused and disjointed. Not all the important waterworks appear to be contemporary; it seems that the military importance of the site, in a region where there were numerous revolts in the 3d and 4th c., justified these creations.

== Archaeology ==
Tubusuptu, located in the fertile Soummam River valley just south of the Port of Saldae, was populated by the Roman soldiers of the Legio VII Claudia. The Roman veterans of Legion VII merged into the population of the valley of the Soummam River.

The region's olive oil was very popular and Tiklat jars were found throughout the Roman Empire, which proves its commercial importance at the beginning of the Christian era.

Today there are still vestiges. There is an aqueduct and also well-preserved thermal baths. An almost intact mosaic is also present on site.

The archaeological district of Béjaïa is planning to carry out work to preserve the site and prevent its degradation. The French archaeologist Jean-Pierre Laporte made a study of these ruins in the 1960s.

Several inscription survive in the ruins.

== History ==
The town is attested in Pliny; Ptolemy and Ammianus Marcellinus The town also appears in the Ravenna Geographer, and Julius Honorius but it is missing from the Antonine Itinerary.

In the late Roman period it became the centre of a military district.

== Bishopric ==
The town was a center for early Christianity with bishops for the town being recorded in 411 and in 484.

The bishopric survives today as a titular see of the Roman Catholic Church and the current bishop is Alphonse Marie van den Bosch.
