= Galen (disambiguation) =

Galen was an ancient Roman physician of Greek origin.

Galen may also refer to:

== Places ==
- Galen, Montana, United States, an unincorporated community
- Galen, New York, United States, a town
- Galen Peak, Palmer Archipelago, Antarctica
- Galen (crater), a lunar impact crater

== Schools ==
- Galen Catholic College, Wangaratta, Victoria, Australia
- Galen University, San Ignacio, Belize
- Galen College of Nursing, a private nursing school in multiple locations in the United States

== People and fictional characters ==
- Galen (given name), a list of people and fictional characters
- Galen (surname), a list of people and fictional characters
- Vasily Blyukher (1889–1938), Soviet military commander who used the pseudonym "Galen" while in China
- Phillip Galen, pen name of Ernst Philipp Karl Lange (1813–1899), German novelist

== Other uses ==
- Galen, a pharmaceutical company renamed Warner Chilcott
- Galen Center, an athletic facility in Los Angeles, California, United States
- Galen Institute, a health policy think tank in Alexandria, Virginia
- Galen, a fictitious town in the novel The Land of Laughs by Jonathan Carroll
- Galen Framework, a software testing framework

== See also ==
- OpenGALEN, a provider of an open source medical terminology
- Von Galen family
- Galan (disambiguation)
- Galena (disambiguation)
- Galien (disambiguation)
- Gehlen (disambiguation)
- Gaylon, a list of people with the given name
