= Gehlen =

Gehlen may refer to:

== People with the surname ==
- Adolph Ferdinand Gehlen (1775–1815), German chemist
- Arnold Gehlen (1904–1976), German philosopher
- Bruno Gehlen (1871–1951), entomologist who described several species including Rhagastis meridionalis
- Kurt von Gehlen (1927–1995), German professor
- Reinhard Gehlen (1902–1979), German Nazi general, intelligence officer
  - Gehlen Organization, founded by him
- Karl Gehlen, German engineer
- Walter Gehlen, German athlete
- Duda (footballer, born 1994), Brazilian footballer born Eduardo Haas Gehlen

== Locations ==
- Gehlen House and Barn, historic buildings in St. Donatus, Iowa, United States
- Gehlen Catholic School, in LeMars, Iowa, United States

== See also ==
- Galan (disambiguation)
- Galen (disambiguation)
- Galien (disambiguation)
- Gehlen (disambiguation)
- Gaylon, a given name
