= Galan =

Galan or Galán may refer to:

== People ==
=== Politicians ===
- Galan Erilich, Pictish king of the 5th or 6th century
- Giancarlo Galan, Italian politician and Governor of the Veneto region
- Magda De Galan, Belgian politician

=== Sportspeople ===
- Augie Galan, American baseball player
- Gillian Galan, French rugby union player

=== Others ===
- Galán (surname)

== Places ==
- Galán, a caldera in Catamarca Province, Argentina
- Galan, Ethiopia, town in Oromia Region, Ethiopia
- Galan, Hautes-Pyrénées, a commune of the Hautes-Pyrénées département, in southwestern France
- Galán, Santander a municipality and town in Colombia
- Galan, Kurdistan, a village in Kurdistan Province, Iran
- Galan, Mazandaran, a village in Mazandaran Province, Iran
- Garza Galán, a city in Coahuila, Mexican
- Kelileh Galan, a village in Kurdistan Province, Iran

== Other uses ==
- Galan (grape), an alternative name of the Bulgarian wine grape Dimiat
- Arthur Galan AG, a fashion brand
- Luis Carlos Galán Velodrome, in Bogotá, Colombia
- Galactus, a cosmic entity in Marvel Comics whose name was once Galan

== See also ==
- Galen (disambiguation)
- Galien (disambiguation)
- Gehlen (disambiguation)
- Nos galan (disambiguation)
