= Galen (surname) =

Galen is the surname of:

== People ==
- Albert J. Galen (1876–1936), Justice of the Montana Supreme Court
- Louis Galen (1925–2007), American banker, CEO and philanthropist
- Rich Galen (born 1946), American columnist, Republican strategist and former press secretary
- Robert S. Galen (born 1946), physician, Professor Emeritus Epidemiology and former Senior Associate Dean in the College of Public Health at the University of Georgia

== Fictional characters ==
- Dr. Galén, in Karel Čapek's play The White Disease and in its movie adaptation Skeleton on Horseback
- Richard Galen, in the Star Trek: The Next Generation episode "The Chase"

== See also ==
- Galen family
