= Galen (given name) =

Galen is an almost exclusively masculine given name. The best-known Galen was a Greek physician, surgeon and philosopher in Ancient Rome. Other Galens include:

== People ==
=== Galen ===
- Galen Bodenhausen (born 1961), American social psychologist
- Galen A. Carter (1832–1893), American politician
- Galen Cisco (born 1936), American former Major League Baseball pitcher
- Galen Clark (1814–1910), first European American to discover the Mariposa Grove of Giant Sequoia trees and conservationist
- Galen Cole (1925–2020), American philanthropist
- Galen Cranz, American professor of architecture
- Galen Dreibelbis (born 1935), American politician
- Galen Gering (born 1971), American actor
- Galen Hadley (born 1942), American politician
- Galen Hall (born 1940), American retired college and professional football coach and player
- Galen Higdon (born 1954), American politician
- Galen Hollenbaugh (fl. 2006–present), American politician
- Galen Laack (1931–1958), American football player
- Galen Rowell (1940–2002), American wilderness photographer, adventure photojournalist and climber
- Galen Rupp (born 1986), American long-distance runner
- Galen Seaman (1837–1932), American lawyer and politician
- Galen L. Stone (1862–1926), American financier and philanthropist
- Galen L. Stone (diplomat) (1921–2018), American diplomat, Ambassador to Cyprus, grandson of the above
- Galen Stone (American football) (born 1988), American former football player
- Galen Strawson (born 1952), British analytic philosopher and literary critic
- Galen D. Stucky, American chemist
- Galen Weston (1940–2021), British-Canadian billionaire businessman and philanthropist
- Galen Weston Jr. (born 1972), Canadian billionaire businessman, son of the above

=== Galyn ===
- Galyn Görg (American actress)
- Galyn Susman

=== Gaelan ===
- Gaelan Connell (American actor and director)

=== Gaelyn/Gaelynn/Gaelynne ===
- Gaelynn Lea (American disability advocate and violinist)
- Gaelyn Gordon (New Zealand writer)

=== Gaelen ===
- Gaelen Foley (American author)
- Gaelen Gilliland (American actress who works in musical theaters)

=== Gaylyn/Gaylyne ===
- Gaylyne Ayugi (Kenyan model)
- Gaylyn Studlar (American critic and professor)

=== Gaylen/Gaylene ===
- Gaylen Byker (American businessman)
- Gaylene Sciascia (New Zealand dance educator)
- Gaylene Preston (New Zealand filmmaker)
- Gaylen Ross (American actress)
- Gaylen Pitts (American baseball coach, manager and player)
- Gaylen C. Hansen (American artist)

== Fictional characters ==
- Galen, a character in the TV series Crusade
- Galen, Dr. Zaius' assistant in the Planet of the Apes TV series
- Galen "Doc" Adams, in the long-running TV series Gunsmoke
- Galen Bradwarden, the protagonist of the 1981 Disney/Paramount co-production Dragonslayer
- Galen DeMarco, a character in the world of Judge Dredd
- Galen Erso, in Rogue One: A Star Wars Story
- Galen Kord, in the Transformers universe
- Galen Marek, a.k.a. Starkiller, a Dark Jedi in the Star Wars: The Force Unleashed project
- Galen Tyrol, in the re-imagined TV series Battlestar Galactica

== See also ==
- Gaylon, an English name popular in the United States
