= Johanna von Westphalen =

German politician (1936–2016)

- Full name: Johanna Paula Alphonsa Josepha Antonia Huberta Maria de Mercede Cosmas und Damian Reichsgräfin von Westphalen zu Fuerstenberg
- Born: Johanna Reichsgräfin von Galen; 24 September 1936; Haus Assen, Westphalia; Germany
- Died: 21 January 2016 (aged 79); Garmisch-Partenkirchen, Bavaria; Germany
- Noble family: Galen (by birth); Westphalen (by marriage)
- Spouse: Count August von Westphalen zu Fürstenberg
- Father: Christoph Bernhard, Count of Galen
- Mother: Countess Marie-Sophie Kinsky von Wchinitz und Tettau
- Occupation: politician, Catholic activist

Countess Johanna von Westphalen zu Fuerstenberg (German: Johanna Reichsgräfin von Westphalen zu Fürstenberg; Johanna Paula Alphonsa Josepha Antonia Huberta Maria de Mercede Cosmas und Damian; née von Galen, 24 September 1936 – 21 January 2016) was a German conservative politician and Catholic activist. A member of the Christian Democratic Union of Germany, she was active in the anti-abortion movement and a patron of Catholic institutions. She was knighted by Pope John Paul II in 2002 as a Dame Grand Cross of the Order of St. Gregory the Great.

== Early life and family ==
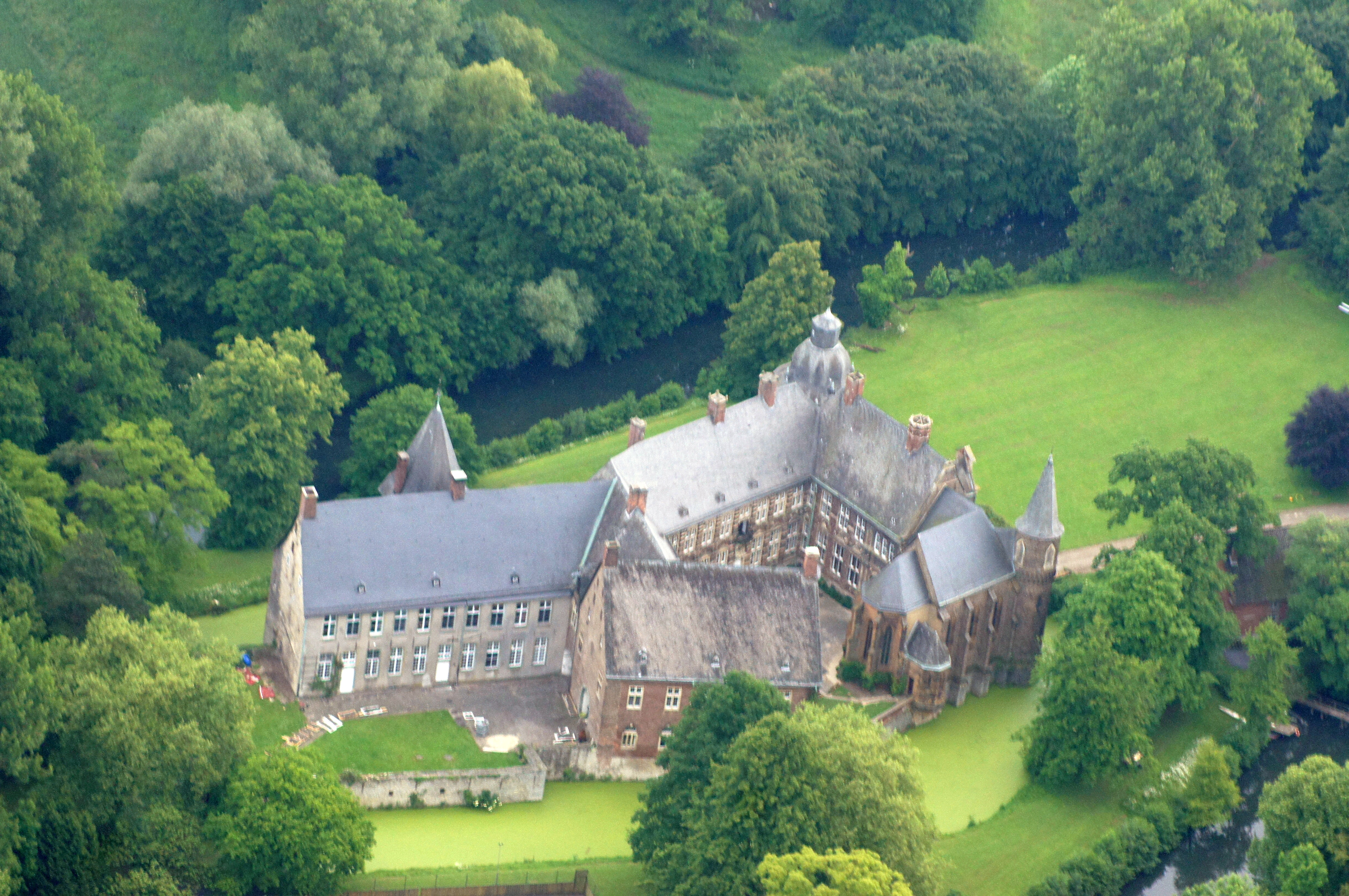
Haus Assen, von Westphalen's birthplace

Von Westphalen was born Countess Johanna von Galen on 24 September 1936 at Haus Assen, her family's castle in Westphalia. She was a member of the Galen family, an ancient German noble family that was elevated to the rank of Imperial Count during the Holy Roman Empire. Von Westphalen's father, Christoph Bernhard, Count of Galen, was the head of the House of Galen and served in the Papal household. Her mother, Countess Marie-Sophie Kinsky von Wchinitz und Tettau, was a member of the Czech noble family Kinsky. Von Westphalen was the grandniece of Cardinal Clemens August Graf von Galen, who had been beatified by Pope John Paul II.

== Politics and activism ==
Von Westphalen was a member of the Christian Democratic Union of Germany and, from 1978 to 1992, served on the regional board of the party in North Rhine-Westphalia. She was an honorary member of the Christian Democratic Union's Christian Friendship Association, a Christian mission and aid organization based in Berlin. She also served on several federal committees for the party. In 1985, she founded the Christian Democrats for Life, an anti-abortion initiative of the Christian Democratic Union and Christian Social Union in Bavaria and a member of the Federal Association for the Law of Life. She served as the initiative's chairwoman until 2002, afterwards serving as honorary chairwoman.

She advocated for changes to public education policy and was active in Catholic social work. Westphalen was a member of Katholischen Elternschaft Deutschlands, Catholic Scouts of Europe, and Sozialdienst katholischer Frauen. She also served as a member of the board of trustees of the Forum of German Catholics. In 1998 Von Westphalen started the anti-abortion campaign Tim Leben! with the Yes to Life Foundation, working alongside Gloria, Princess of Thurn and Taxis, Prince Nikolaus von Lobkowicz, Baroness Elisabeth Motschmann, and Roland Rösler.

Von Westphalen was a patron of the Association of Friends of Angels, which provides aid for social projects in Burkina Faso.

In 2010, Von Westphalen was the first signatory to the Aktion Linkstrend stoppen, which opposed the Berlin Declaration of the Christian Democratic Union's leadership to change economic positions. She accused the German Catholic Scouting Association of Saint George of allowing alcohol and promoting the use of condoms to prevent the spread of AIDS, which she called "propaganda from the gay lobby".

She signed the Marburger Declaration of 2009, for the "freedom and self-determination against totalitarian aspirations of the Lesbian and Gay Associations". She considered homosexuality as a "considerable health and psychological risk", and accused the Lesbian and Gay Federation in Germany of attacking conversion therapy, which she believed limited the "freedom of assembly, speech, scientific discourse, and the choice of therapy."

== Awards and honors ==
In 2002, Von Westphalen was created a Dame Grand Cross of the Order of St. Gregory the Great by Pope John Paul II. She was made a Dame of Honor and Devotion of the Sovereign Military Order of Malta. She was awarded the Federal Cross of the Order of Merit by the German federal government.

== Personal life ==
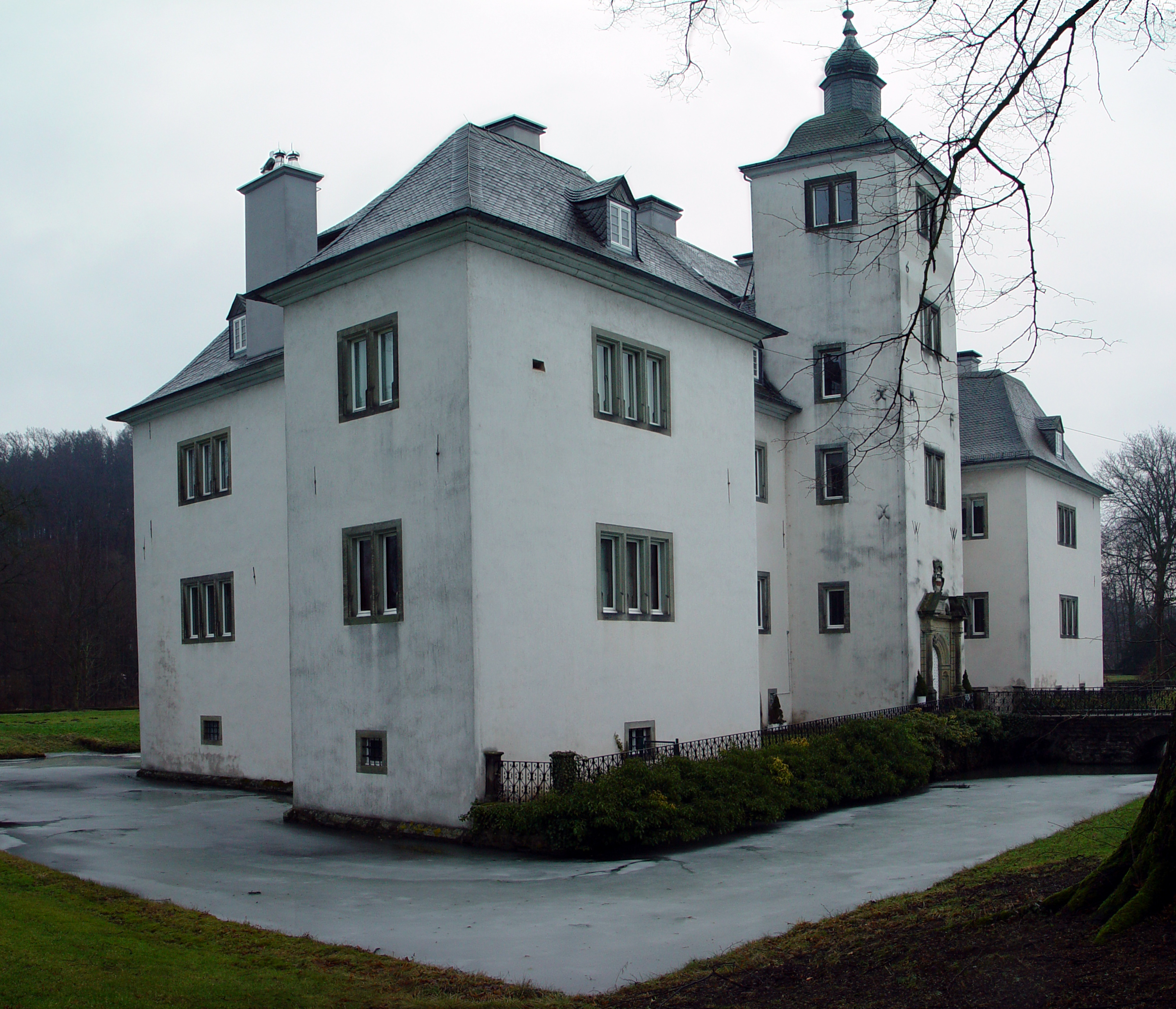
Schloss Laer

Von Westphalen was married to Count August von Westphalen zu Fürstenberg and had six children. She lived with her family in her husband's family home, Schloss Laer, in Meschede.

After the death of her mother in 1992, Von Westphalen encouraged her father to allow the Traditionalist Catholic congregation Servants of Jesus and Mary to use the family castle, Haus Assen.

Von Westphalen died on 21 January 2016 in Garmisch-Partenkirchen.
