= Madeleine Cosman =

Educator and author

Madeleine Pelner Cosman (December 4, 1937 – March 2, 2006) was an academic writer-researcher, policy analyst and advocate. She long held faculty membership at City College of New York.

As a medical lawyer, educator and healthcare policy guru, she testified before Congress, wrote 15 books and buttressed politicians' arguments against mass immigration. Lecture appointments took her throughout the United States and to Australia, New Zealand, South Africa, Israel, and Western Europe. She contributed to think tanks that reflected her philosophy on medical and legal issues: the Cato and Galen Institutes.

== Education ==
Cosman's degrees include

- J.D. from the Benjamin N. Cardozo School of Law (1995)
- Ph.D. in English and comparative literature from Columbia University (1964)
- M.A. in Comparative Literature from Hunter College (1960)
- B.A. from Barnard College (1959)

Cosman was a professor in the Department of English at City College of New York from 1964 until her retirement in 1993. She was a member of the New York Academy of Medicine and a Professor of Medical Law.

== Medieval and Renaissance studies ==
In 1968, Cosman became founding director of the City College of New York Institute for Medieval and Renaissance Studies, which granted undergraduate and graduate degrees. From the 1970s she helped organize the Renaissance Fair at The Cloisters. She was also a scholar of medieval medicine. Her book, Fabulous Feasts: Medieval Cookery and Ceremony (1976) was nominated for a Pulitzer Prize and the National Book Award.

According to one obituary, she lectured for years "on cable television at the Metropolitan Museum of New York on medieval daily life. She was deeply passionate about ideas and her gift was to share her ideas with an intelligent audience."

== Advocacy ==
"She never practiced law," her daughter said. "She used her knowledge of the law to be more effective as a policy analyst." "Known for an engaging speaking style that illuminated her legal savvy, Cosman was a favorite guest on talk radio." She was a board member of the California Rifle and Pistol Association.

=== Health-care policy ===
For nearly 30 years, Cosman taught medical students medical law, medical business and medical history at City College of City University of New York. and was a strong advocate for personal choice of one's own medical care. Her views spawned an hourlong presentation on C-span titled "Who owns your body" as well as books titled "ABCs of the Clinton Medical World" (published 1993) and "Selling the Medical Practice: The Physicians and Surgeons Guide" (published 1988)

=== Immigration issues ===
Cosman appeared frequently with host Mark Edwards of "Wake Up America". She provided the medical legal data for "Hold Their Feet to the Fire," a project of Americans for Legal Immigration, which countered high levels of unskilled immigration and naturalization.

The same stance to such policy attracted more Congress members during the Obama presidency, a stance shared by political opponent Donald Trump who won the 2016 presidential election.

== Criticism ==
Critics have objected that many of her controversial claims on immigration and medicine are untrue. A reporter on Lou Dobbs' CNN program had cited as facts Cosman's claims that there were, over three years, 7000 cases of leprosy in the United States and that many of them were the result of illegal immigrants bringing the disease into the country, when the statistics show the number was for a 30-year period and shows no correlation to immigration. Dobbs has since rejected the claims as unsubstantiated.

Cosman was also accused of anti-Mexican bias. For example, railing against criminals from the immigrant community, she made the following ominous warning: "Recognize that most of these bastards molest girls under age twelve, some as young as age five, others age three. Although, of course, some specialize in boys, some specialize in nuns, some are exceedingly versatile and rape little girls age eleven and women up to age seventy-nine."

== Death ==
Cosman died in Escondido, California. The cause was complications of scleroderma, a chronic disease of the connective tissue.
