= Gaylen Hansen =

American artist (born 1921)

Gaylen C. Hansen
- Born: Gaylen Capener Hansen; September 21, 1921 (age 104); Garland, Utah, U.S.
- Education: University of Southern California, Los Angeles, California (1953); Utah State College, Logan, Utah (1952)
- Known for: Painting
- Spouse: Heidi Oberheide
- Awards: Flintridge Foundation Award for Visual Artists (2002); Washington State Governor’s Arts Award (1990); Sambuca Romana Contemporary Artists Fellowship (1984)

Gaylen Capener Hansen (born September 21, 1921) is an American artist best known for neo-expressionist figurative paintings that feature the flora and fauna of the Palouse, a geographically unusual area in Eastern Washington state where he lives and works, and "the Kernal," Hansen's alter-ego frontiersman whose often-perilous adventures are depicted in many of the artist's canvases.

Hansen's paintings have been exhibited in museums and galleries in Seattle, Los Angeles, New York, Berlin, Beijing, and Singapore, and are held in numerous public and private collections.

Hansen has received several prestigious awards, including the Flintridge Foundation Awards for Visual Artists in 2001.

Between 2007 and 2010, Hansen was the subject of a traveling retrospective exhibition, titled "Gaylen Hansen: Three Decades of Paintings."

Hansen served on the faculty at Washington State University in Pullman, Washington, from 1957 to 1982.

== Early life and education ==
Gaylen Hansen was born in Garland, Utah, on September 21, 1921. During the mid-1800s, Hansen's family traveled west with Mormon pioneers to escape religious persecution. They settled in the valley of the Great Salt Lake, then a wild and uncultivated wilderness. Until World War II, horses were used by the Mormons to farm the rugged land, demanding work that young Gaylen said he was "made for." Hansen rode saddle horses and worked with cows, sheep, goats, pigs, dogs, cats, geese, ducks, chickens and pigeons. All would turn up again later in Hansen's paintings.

Until 1927, Hansen lived with his parents in Salt Lake City and Ogden, Utah. Following his parents' divorce, Hansen and his brother, Arthur, returned to Garland to live on an organic farm owned by his mother's parents. Hansen's mother, Verna (Whalen) Hansen, a dressmaker who enjoyed grand opera and art, soon moved to Los Angeles, California, to secure employment. While at the farm, Hansen began drawing images "based on illustrations in The Saturday Evening Post." Hansen's grandfather discouraged Gaylen's interest in art. However, his father, Neils M. Hansen, a Harvard University-educated engineer who was wiped out during the Great Depression in 1929, had illustrated a self-penned book about his outdoor adventures and encouraged his son's budding interest.

In 1938, Hansen moved to Salt Lake City during his senior year of high school to care for Neils, who was stricken with cancer. During that period, Gaylen and a classmate, Frank Bacher, painted watercolors by the Jordan River. Neils died in the same year.

In 1939, Hansen moved to Los Angeles to live with his mother and enrolled at the Otis Art Institute, a training institution for young artists who aspired to careers in academia.

Hansen returned to Salt Lake City in 1940 to work in a sign shop with Frank Bacher. They continued to paint together, doing "various kinds of modern painting." Later that year, Bacher moved to New York City and Hansen attended the Art Barn School of Fine Arts in Salt Lake City, where he also taught a figure drawing class.

In 1943, Hansen moved to New York City to study art and viewed works by modern artists including Henri Rousseau, Pablo Picasso, Paul Klee, Marsden Hartley, and Matta Echaurren.

The next year, he returned to Salt Lake City and married Shirley Anderson. Hansen volunteered for military duty but was classified 4-F ("unfit for duty") by the U.S. Army Air Corps because of troubling x-ray results. Instead, Hansen studied airplane engine mechanics and worked at Hill Field Air Base in Ogden.

In 1945, Hansen enrolled in the University of Utah. The following year, he attended Utah State College in Logan on an art scholarship.

In 1952, Hansen earned a B.S. degree at Utah State College.

Also in 1952, Hansen commenced graduate studies at the University of Southern California, Los Angeles. He completed a Master of Fine Arts (MFA) degree in 1953.

== Teaching career (1940–1982) ==
In 1940, Hansen taught his first art class, figure drawing, at the Art Barn School of Fine Arts in Salt Lake City, Utah.

In 1947, prior to earning his B.S. degree from Utah State College, Hansen became an instructor at the University of Texas, Austin, where he taught until 1952.

From 1954 to 1957, Hansen taught at Yakima Valley College in Yakima, Washington, where he also supervised the Larson Gallery.

In 1957, Hansen moved Pullman, Washington, to teach at Washington State University (WSU).

Hansen retired from teaching at WSU in 1982.

=== Students ===
Cartoonist Gary Larson, creator of The Far Side, a single-panel cartoon series, was a student of Hansen's at WSU. Larson contributed "A Cartoonist Deconstructs an Artist: Here Goes Nothin'!" for the book "Gaylen Hansen: Three Decades of Painting," published in conjunction with a Hansen retrospective exhibition of the same name. Larson wrote:

From almost the first moment I lay eyes on any one of Hansen’s paintings, I feel a sensation that is reminiscent of that day he drew the human figure in our class. And that sensation is best described as an emotional cycle of awe, exhilaration, envy, humility, and depression.

Other Hansen students who became "serious and respected artists" include Ken Cory, Jack Dollhausen, Robert Helm, Les LePere, and Patrick Siler. Dollhausen, Helm, and Siler also took teaching positions at WSU.

== Formative experiences ==
During the neo-expressionist boom of the 1970s, Gaylen Hansen came to the attention art world. His signature style was influenced by important 20th Century artists, art movements, and personal and cultural events.

=== 1940s ===
During his teaching tenure at the University of Austin during the 1940s, Hansen said he painted in a range of styles: "Mondrian, Picasso, Paul Klee, plus realistic still lifes and drawings."

While in Austin, Hansen viewed paintings by Jackson Pollock and attended a lecture by Thomas Hart Benton.

Hansen married his first wife, Shirley Anderson, in 1944.

=== 1950s ===
Between 1953 and 1954, Hansen worked as an illustrator at the Hancock Foundation at USC and made "fish drawings" for a scientist at the University of California, Los Angeles (UCLA). Later, Hansen noted that "I'm capable of quite good realism, believe it or not. I was a very accomplished draftsman, know anatomy thoroughly, could draw and articulate the figure well."

While teaching at Yakima Valley College during the mid-1950s, Hansen met artist Roy De Forest, who would inherit Hansen's teaching position. Hansen credited De Forest, known for his comic-like depictions of dogs, with turning "my head around to a different angle of perception."

Hansen later reflected that during the 1950s he "continued slugging it out with abstract expressionism, learning more what it was about but at the same time wondering why I was doing it."

=== 1960s ===
Between 1962 and 1964, Hansen developed a working relationship with Canadian graduate student Iain Baxter (now a noted conceptual artist) at WSU. Hansen and Baxter explored many art movements, including the work of Italian artist Giorgio Morandi, who obsessively arranged and rearranged the same ordinary objects for his canvases. Hansen described his and Baxter's investigations:

One of the things we did was to play with objects on a table. We suspended any kind of aesthetic preconceptions. And we discovered that objects could be put in any way they could be physically put. We found that we could put the objects in the center, on the edge at the corners, or wherever…and that each kind of arrangement yielded a different but specific effect. Some arrangements had a stronger presence than others.

Hansen's wife Shirley (Anderson) Hansen died in 1963. In 1965, Hansen married Patricia Cassidy.

During a sabbatical from WSU in 1966 and 1967, Hansen and Patricia visited Stinson Beach, California, 10 miles north of San Francisco. Hansen was exposed to Bay Area hippie counterculture and impressed by the work of such rising stars in the art world as Wayne Thiebaud, Robert Crumb, Robert Arneson, William T. Wiley, and "psychedelic artist" Peter Max.

Hansen returned to Pullman with highly patterned paintings influenced by California funk art, Op art, and underground comix. Many of the paintings featured arrangements of bent legs clad in colorful striped stockings.

A former colleague, Robert Ecker, said Hansen, who "struggled with his Mormon youth all the time, was a convert to the 1960s" by the time he returned from his sabbatical.

Also during the 1960s, Hansen was introduced to the work of experimental American composer John Cage, whose explorations of chance and ambient sounds strongly influenced the artist.

=== 1970s ===
In 1970, Hansen and wife Patricia moved into an old log roadhouse outside of Pullman, which he christened the "Country Club." The couple shared the Country Club with chickens, dogs, and ducks, and planted thousands of tulip bulbs.

Hansen began his Fort Bentleg series of canvases, "painting scenes from around the place…I really felt quite free of the usual concerns – whether [the paintings] were contemporary or avant-garde, which at the time were still considered important issues."

Hansen depicted the Country Club enclosed by walls adorned with hearts and surrounded by dog-headed mountains. In Hansen's paintings, the Country Club was inhabited by a bearded pipe-smoking figure who would become the prototype for "the Kernal," Hansen's alter ego. Hansen also began to make paintings of the Kernal going on long journeys.

Later, Hansen said "the psychology of separation and the rustic country feel of the place slanted my work toward a kind of folk or primitive appearance."

During the mid-1970s, Hansen concluded that he was not destined to connect with "modern art or New York or any kind of mainstream developments." He decided that he "might as well do what amused me primarily. Prior to that I had been concerned about the rest of the art world."

Hansen recalled that his work "began to take on a more distinctive and personal look around 1975. However some of the earlier basic concepts and methods persisted, and still do."

=== 1980s ===
In 1982, Hansen and wife Patricia divorced.

Also in 1982, while working as a visiting artist at the Banff School of Fine Arts in Alberta, Canada, Hansen met Heidi Oberheide, a visiting artist from Newfoundland, who was teaching printmaking. They married in 1984.

In 1985, Hansen's first retrospective exhibition, "Gaylen Hansen: The Paintings of a Decade, 1975-1985," was presented at the Museum of Art at Washington State University in Pullman, Washington, and other art institutions. For the catalog that accompanied the exhibition, co-curator Bruce Guenther wrote:

Hansen possesses the imaginative gift to transmute an everyday event into a vividly animated vision. His rural fictions create a universe slightly askew and infused with gentle wit.

== Subjects and themes ==
For four decades, Gaylen Hansen has animated his paintings with subjects drawn from his intimate relationship with the Palouse, a peculiar landscape of humps and hollows that were sculpted by prehistoric dust storms.

In his Eastern Washington studio, Hansen summons familiar flora, fauna, and favorite objects to his canvases, including dogs, tulips, trout, grasshoppers, magpies, moons, work gloves, bison, bulls, bears, and ducks. However, Hansen depicts and arranges his recurring subjects in a manner uniquely his own. In Hansen's paintings, a trout takes wing with a flock of ducks; a minivan-sized grasshopper perches on a sofa; a bison, a trout, and a tulip stand on end at equal heights in a neat row; and giant gleaming moons light the way, or deepen dread.

A frequent traveler among these odd ensembles is a bearded character Hansen calls "the Kernal," often described as the artist's alter-ego, or Everyman figure. The Kernal, who bears more than a passing resemblance to Hansen, is usually shown in profile, seemingly aloof to the curious circumstances unfolding about him. Thus Hansen's images are more a reflection of his "interior landscape" than the literal objects he depicts.

In a 2007 interview, Hansen recalled how ancient Egyptian and Persian miniature art influenced his narrative style:

When I turned to this kind of painting, Egyptian paintings figured in and Indian and Persian miniatures, because Persian miniatures in part are narrative and combine form and content quite wonderfully. The problem for me was to develop a way of drawing that allowed me to simplify without it looking like realism formalized. It was part caricature, part expressionism. Expressionism and caricature have something in common.

For the "Gaylen C. Hansen" exhibition at the Glowbow Museum in 1979, art curator Peter White wrote:

"[T]he dominant source of [Hansen’s narrative canvases] would appear to be the wall and tomb painting of ancient Egypt and Rome. Here, without the benefit of conventional perspective, the ordering of elements is not based on their actual, objective placement in space. In this art, as in Hansen’s paintings, it is through discontinuities of scale and the decorative patterning and linking of independent elements by rhythm, pace and a conscious sense of balance and placement across the flat picture plane that an evocative and descriptive representation of reality is achieved.

In 1985, Hansen embraced characterizations of his expressionistic work as naïve:

I have done paintings that lead some people to believe I'm an honest-to-goodness naïve painter right from the start amazes me. It must be because I get into a way of thinking that’s like the way naïve and primitive painters think. And I don't see the description 'primitive' as a criticism of my work. I do admit to being partial to primitive, naïve, and eccentric works, and some folk art...I like it when I can do a symbolic statement of an object that has the feel of the original if not the exact form. My dogs are, to a certain extent, caricatures. The distortions make them more effective, more powerful.

Over time, Hansen's work has become increasingly "immediate and spontaneous, with a looser, more painterly feel."

Hansen also acknowledges using humor in his work "as a way of dealing with the seriousness of it all…It tickles me when our usual, rational side is challenged in some way. Particularly within a painting where it's not going to harm anybody."

Art curator Peter White described the "humanizing" effect of humor in Hansen's "grand" works:

Tongue planted firmly in cheek, Hansen reinforces the irony by means of a formal style which, resembling animated cartoons and comic strips, lends a vernacular touch to an idea whose grandness would seem to call for a correspondingly grand treatment. Thus mediated by humour, the scale of Hansen’s paintings is also human.

Hansen's paintings can also veer away from humor toward "dark extremes of desperation and fear." In a 2013 exhibit, Hansen's dogs, often humorous subjects in his paintings, displayed a very different character. In her review of the exhibit, The Seattle Times art critic and professor Gayle Clemans wrote:

Here, [the dogs] sometimes wear white masks, a motif we haven't seen before. In art, dogs have been a symbol of fidelity and domestication for centuries. In Hansen's works, they become feral, confronting us in packs, their eyes white or red and their bodies made up of slashing, jumbled brushwork.

In 1979, art curator Peter White observed:

Dogs which were once man’s best friend are transformed [by Hansen] into vicious, wolf-like predators and grasshoppers, scourges in a fertile land, are blown-up into gigantic, menacing proportions…[In one painting, the Kernal] is the happy fisherman in a land of such bounty that the sky is filled with leaping fish. In another the fish are leaping but this time it’s in ambush.

=== The Palouse ===
Since 1957, Hansen has lived in a geographically odd area in Eastern Washington known as the Palouse. The other-worldly quality of the Palouse landscape and indigenous elements within it imbue Hansen's paintings with "the potential for magic and transformation."

Hansen comments on the importance of the Palouse in his work: "Paintings that don't work don't have a sense of place." Nevertheless, Hansen says his depictions of the Palouse do not "rely too much on the natural order of things."

A bountiful agricultural area, the Palouse is marked by its distinctive topography of virtually bald hills, a geographical feature said to be found in only one other place in the world. According to art curator Peter White, the Palouse landscape resembles an uneven ripple pattern, which contributes to a "distortion of spatial values." White noted that a "softened and generalized light" in the region adds to an "ambiguity of perspective." Against this backdrop, White observed, "objects stand out in sharp relief and outline."

In an undated note, Hansen wrote, "Open space in [the Palouse] has a direct relationship with the way I react to the space in paintings. That is, whatever features there are stand out dramatically."

Peter White wrote:

Hansen’s exaggerated manipulations which evoke the Palouse also become the bearers of subjective feeling as elements achieve a scale, placement and character based on their intrinsic importance for Hansen rather than their actual objective appearance.

==== Hanford Nuclear Reservation ====
In 1998, author and art critic Matthew Kangas wrote that Hansen's paintings reveal the artist's concerns about a natural environment under siege:

No matter how amusing or enchanting a Gaylen Hansen painting appears, there is always an unsettling quality that suggests nature gone wrong. "Fish in Stream," 1997, depicts a mass of fish battling upstream. Red, orange and green spots on the salmon not only identify their species, but suggest the toxic aftermath of years of industrial pollution...Living in Palouse, Whitman County, downwind from the Hanford Nuclear Reservation, the Utah-born Hansen has long been concerned about delayed effects of scattered radiation.

The Palouse lies 150 miles northeast of the Hanford Nuclear Reservation, a 586-square-mile shrub-steppe desert. Between 1943 and 1987, the Hanford site was used to produce plutonium for the bomb that brought World War II to an end, and to meet potential threats during the Cold War. Weapons production processes left solid and liquid wastes that posed a risk to the local environment. A federal effort to clean up the Hanford site began in 1989.

=== The Kernal ===
While on a sabbatical leave in California from WSU in the 1960s, Hansen drew a cartoon-like figure of a bent leg with black and white stripes that would evolve into a favorite recurring subject, which he called "the Kernal."

I was intrigued by it because it had absolutely no meaning and in the atmosphere of the time that was an intriguing concept. I started playing with it as a motif and I ended up with three "Bentleg Sunsets" — quite handsome paintings actually. I had bentlegs flying around and somehow it turned into Fort Bentleg…It was a place where all kinds of things could happen, and it had to have a colonel and the colonel could ride out. And I spelled it with a "k" because it was a corny idea. At that time we were playing down art with a capital "A" and that made it possible to kind of redirect ourselves.

The Kernal and Fort Bentleg may have been inspired in part by Hansen's readings of the journals of American explorers Lewis and Clark, and his wonderment of "a time when you could be surprised by nature."

Hansen has commented that the Kernal's resemblance to the artist was not deliberate:

I wasn’t conscious of the Kernal being my alter ego. And I didn’t intentionally paint him to look like me. But, of course, he is and does. I do like to think of him as Everyman.

Hansen has described the state of the Kernal's impassive countenance as "suspend time," in which the Kernal does not react to the environment around him:

I often paint the Kernal in a situation that is larger than life. It’s usually perilous, too. Although he’s often somewhat aloof to the whole thing.”

In 1987, Los Angeles Times art critic Suzanne Muchnic wrote that Hansen uses the Kernal as a device to insulate viewers from "a tension about this art--a rickety balance of nature and man-against-beast":

Hansen cloaks his hero in a mantle of naïveté and protects his viewers with the distance of fantasy and wit.

== Methods ==
Hansen eschews stretcher bars, easels, and picture frames in his work. Instead, he staples blank canvases to a wall in his studio and tears them down when done painting them. According to art curator Peter White, the canvases' tattered edges lend them a "feeling of remnants from another civilization."

Hansen often works on more than one painting at a time.

If Hansen is displeased with a painting, he may discard it upside down atop other spurned paintings on the floor of his studio, or burn it in his yard.

Many of Hansen's canvases are large-scale works. A Hansen painting in the Seattle Art Museum Collection, "Fish in a Landscape" (1979), measures 72 1/4 inches x 168 inches.

Hansen has painted similar paintings with oil and acrylic paints to compare the different qualities of the two mediums.

== Exhibitions ==
Gaylen Hansen's work has been widely exhibited in solo and group exhibitions in the United States and internationally.

=== Museums and institutions ===
From 1985 to 1987, a retrospective exhibition, "Gaylen Hansen: The Paintings of a Decade, 1975-1985," was presented at the Seattle Art Museum, Seattle, WA; University Art Museum, Pullman, WA; Boise Gallery of Art, Boise, ID; Galerie Redmann, Berlin, Germany; Museum of Art, Pennsylvania State University, Pennsylvania, PA; Portland Center for the Visual Arts, Portland, OR; and San Jose Museum of Art, San Jose, CA. The exhibition also travelled to the Los Angeles Municipal Art Gallery in Barnsdall Art Park and the Koplin Gallery.

In 1999, a traveling exhibition, titled "Wild Beasts!", featured paintings by Hansen and Roy De Forest, which were described as "irreverent and humorous visual narratives based on [the artists'] lives and experiences in the American West." Organized by the Paris Gibson Square Museum of Art in Great Falls, MT, the exhibition was presented at Paris Gibson Square Museum of Art; Yellowstone Art Museum, Billings, MT; Museum of Northwest Art, La Conner, WA; and Schneider Museum of Art, Ashland, OR.

In 2007 and 2008, Hansen was the subject of "Gaylen Hansen: Three Decades of Paintings," a retrospective exhibition organized by the Museum of Art at Washington State University (WSU). The exhibition was presented at Museum of Art at WSU, Pullman WA; Northwest Museum of Arts and Culture, Spokane, WA; Seattle Art Museum, Seattle, WA; Salt Lake Art Center, Salt Lake City, UT; and the Missoula Art Museum, Missoula, MT. In 2010, the exhibition was presented at the Maui Arts and Cultural Center in Maui, HI.

=== Galleries ===
Gallery exhibitions of Hansen's paintings were presented at Otto Seligman Gallery, Seattle, WA (1959); Seattle Art Museum, Seattle, WA (1959); University of Idaho, Moscow, ID (1966); Spokane Art Center, Spokane, WA (1967); University of Colorado, Boulder, CO (1972); Fine Arts Center, Washington State University, Pullman, WA (1967, 1972, 1975, 1977); Spokane Falls Community College Art Gallery, Spokane, WA (1980); Manolides Gallery, Seattle, WA (1977, 1976, 1981); Glenbow Museum, Calgary, Alberta, Canada (1981); Monique Knowlton Gallery, New York, NY (1980, 1981, 1983, 1987, 1990, 1992, 1994); and LewAllen Galleries, Santa Fe, NM (2000).

Since 2001, Hansen's work has been shown at the Linda Hodges Gallery, Seattle, WA (Hansen's gallery representative; 1984–Present); A.V.C. Contemporary Arts, New York, NY (2003); and Stremmel Gallery, Reno, NV (2010–Present).

International exhibitions of Hansen's work have been presented in Berlin, Jakarta, Singapore, and Beijing.

== Recognition ==
In 2002, Hansen was given a Flintridge Foundation Award for Visual Artists for "serious continued artistic exploration and the development of a distinctive artistic voice that can be identified in the artists' work dating back 20-plus years." In 1990, Hansen received the Washington State Governor's Arts Award, presented by Gov. Booth Gardner. In 1984, Hansen received a Sambuca Romana Contemporary Artists Fellowship from The New Museum of Contemporary Art in New York, New York.

== Permanent collections ==
- Smithsonian American Art Collection (Washington, DC)
- Seattle Art Museum (Seattle, Washington, US)
- New Museum of Contemporary Art (New York, New York)
- Arkansas Art Center (Little Rock, Arkansas, US)
- Northwest Museum of Arts & Culture (Spokane, Washington, US)
- City of Seattle, Office of Arts and Cultural Affairs (Seattle, Washington, US)
- Museum of Art, Washington State University (Spokane, Washington, US)
- Yale University Art Gallery, Yale University (New Haven, Connecticut, US)
- Tacoma Art Museum (Tacoma, Washington, US)
- Boise Art Museum (Boise, Idaho, US)
- Microsoft Corporation (Redmond, Washington, US)

== Personal life ==
Hansen lived for decades in the Palouse region of Eastern Washington with his wife, artist Heidi Oberheide, in a small house, barn, and neighboring studios overlooking a river valley. In 2014, the couple relocated to Whidbey Island, drawn by its "country feeling" and smaller population. Hansen found inspiration in the old-growth forest of South Whidbey State Park, which led to new paintings he had never done in eastern Washington. Oberheide, whom gallery director John Braseth described as "inseparable" from Hansen "in life and in art," has since died. He turned 100 in September 2021.
