= University of Georgia College of Public Health =

Academic program in Athens, Georgia, US

Coordinates: 33.96370°N 83.40550°W

- Type: Public
- Established: 2005
- Dean: Dr. Marsha Davis
- Location: Athens, Georgia, USA
- Website: publichealth.uga.edu

The College of Public Health (CPH) is a college within the University of Georgia (UGA) in Athens, Georgia, United States.

== History ==
The College of Public Health (CPH) officially opened as University of Georgia's 15th college in January 2005 after receiving approval from the UGA University Council in September 2004 and the Georgia Board of Regents in October 2005. It was the first public health school created within the University System of Georgia. The dean of the school is Phillip L. Williams, Ph.D.. He has been the only dean in the short history of the school. He served as interim dean from the initial opening in 2005 until being named to the position permanently on November 10, 2006. Williams was also on the internal committee that proposed the formation of the college. The Institute of Gerontology also joined the CPH in July 2005.

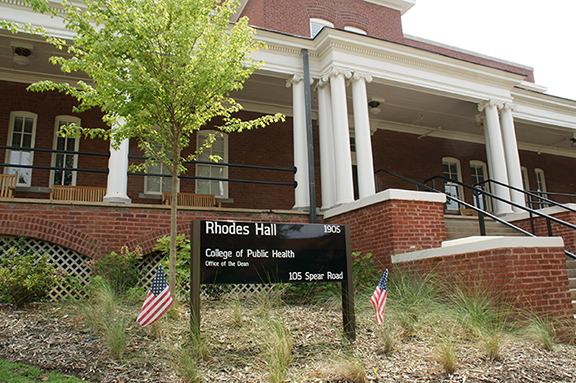
Rhodes Hall, located on the University of Georgia Health Sciences Campus, became the administrative home of the UGA College of Public Health in October 2013.

The new college was founded to house various research, faculty and outreach programs in one college so that public health needs would be better addressed. The Department of Environmental Health Science in the College of Agricultural and Environmental Sciences and the Department of Health Promotion and Behavior in the College of Education were moved to CPH. New departments were created including: the Department of Epidemiology and Biostatistics and the Department of Health Policy and Management. Also since 2005, the College of Public Health has expanded to include the Institute for Disaster Management and the Center for Global Health.

Upon opening, the Master of Public Health (MPH) graduate degree program initially incubated by UGA Biomedical and Health Sciences Institute was moved into the College of Public Health.

In 2012, the College of Public Health began its move the UGA Health Sciences Campus, established on the site of the former Navy Supply Corps School (NSCS) on Prince Avenue in Athens. The property was deeded to UGA by the U.S. Department of Education in April 2011. In March 2012, faculty and staff of the College of Public Health's Center for Global Health moved into a section of Wright Hall that was previously used as a conference center by the NSCS. The Center joined two other CPH academic units, which moved into renovated space in Miller Hall that January: the Department of Epidemiology and Biostatistics, and the Institute for Evidence-Based Health Professions Education. In October 2013, the administrative offices of the college, including the Dean's Office moved Rhodes Hall. The Hudson Clinic facility, utilized by the NSCS as a health and dental clinic, will become the new home of CPH's Institute of Gerontology in August 2014. Wright Hall, a former NSCS lodging facility, is currently being repurposed for the office and research needs of Health Promotion and Behavior and Health Policy and Management departments.

== Departments ==
Over 52 faculty are members of the following units at CPH:

- Department of Environmental Health Science
- Department of Epidemiology and Biostatistics
- Department of Health Policy and Management
- Department of Health Promotion and Behavior
- Global Health Institute
- Health Informatics Institute
- Institute of Gerontology
- Institute for Disaster Management

== Degrees offered ==
=== Undergraduate degrees ===
The following undergraduate degrees are offered by the CPH:

- Bachelor of Science in Environmental Health (B.S.E.H.)
- Bachelor of Science in Health Promotion (B.S.H.P.)

Minors

- Disaster Management
- Environmental Health Science
- Gerontology
- Global Health
- Health Policy and Management
- Public Health

=== Graduate degrees ===
The following graduate degrees are offered by the CPH:

- Master of Public Health (MPH)
- Master of Science in Biostatistics
- Master of Science in Environmental Health (MSEH)
- Ph.D. in Biostatistics
- Ph.D. in Epidemiology
- Ph.D. in Health Promotion
- Doctor of Public Health (DrPH)

Dual degree programs available include:

- DVM/MPH with the University of Georgia College of Veterinary Medicine
- JD/MPH with the University of Georgia School of Law
- MBA/MPH with the Terry College of Business
- MD/MPH with Georgia Regents University
- MSW/MPH with the University of Georgia School of Social Work
- PharmD/MPH with the University of Georgia College of Pharmacy

== Notable faculty members ==
- José F. Cordero
- Robert S. Galen

== Notable research ==
Beginning in the 1990s, the Institute of Gerontology began the Georgia Centenarian Study, a ten-year project to study common habits and personality traits among centenarians in 31 Georgia counties. In 2001, the National Institute on Aging provided an additional $7.5 million to prolong and expand the study.

Along with colleagues, Cham Dallas, a professor in the department of health policy and management and director of the Institute for Disaster Management, released a research report in 2017 that found that the medical profession "lacked knowledge regarding nuclear and radiological contamination risks" which can affect the healthcare profession's ability to respond to those types of disasters. The study was called "Readiness for Radiological and Nuclear Events among Emergency Medical Personnel" and published in Frontiers for Public Health.

== Notes ==
- UGA College of Public Health
- UGA College of Public Health Magazine
- UGA Graduate School degrees, searchable by school
- Undergraduate and professional degrees offered by the University of Georgia, UGA Bulletin
- Georgia Magazine, March 2006 Vol 84: No. 3
- Atlanta Business Chronicle, October 29, 2010
