= Robert Brachtenbach =

American judge

Justice of the Washington Supreme Court
- In office 1972–1995

Member of the Washington House of Representatives from the 14th district
- In office 1963–1965

Personal details
- Born: January 28, 1931 Sidney, Nebraska, U.S.
- Died: May 2, 2008 (aged 77) Cottage Grove, Oregon, U.S.
- Party: Republican

Robert Francis Brachtenbach (January 28, 1931 – May 2, 2008) was an American politician and jurist from the state of Washington.

== Early life and education ==
Brachtenbach was born in Sidney, Nebraska. His parents moved the family to Goldendale, then to the southeast of Yakima, when he was a young child. He started working at the age of 10 by working in the fields during harvest time. During his teenage years, he stocked grocery shelves.

Brachtenbach dropped out of Yakima High School (now Davis High School) in the mid-1940s to work full-time at the grocery store. At the urging of friends and family, he was persuaded to return to school. He attended Yakima Valley College, then the University of Washington, where he earned his law degree.

== Political career ==
After earning his law degree, Brachtenbach opened a law practice in Selah.

In 1962, Brachtenbach decided to run for the Washington House of Representatives at the urging of his friend, Alex Deccio, a longtime state senator. He won the election and later served as a Republican floor leader. He did not seek re-election in 1966, opting instead to return to the full-time practice of law.

== Washington Supreme Court ==
In 1972, Brachtenbach was appointed by Governor Daniel J. Evans to the state Supreme Court. He accepted the appointment after rejecting previous offers for lower positions. He also served a two-year stint as chief justice.

Brachtenbach served on the court for 22 years until his 1994 retirement, making his one of the longest serving justices in Washington state history. He was one of only five Yakima Valley residents to serve on the Washington Supreme Court.

== Famous opinions ==
In 1986, Robert Brachtenbach, was a front runner, in promoting that Washington State should allow lawsuits for negligent construction. As Justice Brachtenbach once wrote for the court, “[t]he auto should run down the road without wheels falling off and new houses should provide habitation without foundations falling apart.” 5 Frickel v. Sunnyside Enterprises, Inc., 725 P.2d 422, 424 (1986)

Robert Brachtenbach wrote the majority opinion, in the famous WPPSS bond default case. The court ruled that Washington local governments lacked sufficient authority to commit to paying for the costs of two nuclear power plants built by an intergovernmental power authority if those municipalities did not receive power or if they did not have adequate control over the design and construction of those nuclear facilities.

Brachtenbach, while sitting as a Washington State Supreme Court Justice, wrote the opinion for Brown v. Voss, 105 Wash.2d 366, 715 P.2d 514 (1986). The issue in Voss was: to what extent can the owner of a private road easement traverse the servient estate to not only reach the dominant estate, but a parcel (subsequently acquired by the dominant estate owner) adjacent to the dominant estate when such usage does not increase the burden on the servient estate? While Brachtenbach stated the general rule that an easement appurtenant to one parcel of land may not be extended by the owner of the dominant estate to an additional non-dominant parcel owned by the owner of the dominant estate regardless of whether the additional parcel is adjacent to the dominant estate, and further declared that if an easement appurtenant serves a particular parcel of land, any extension of the easement is a misuse of the easement—Brachtenbach still ultimately allowed the owner of the dominant estate to continue using the easement to access the additional, non-dominant estate because a grant of injunctive relief would be inappropriate in light of the circumstances. In short, Brachtenbach essentially found in favor of the Plaintiff by not granting the defendant injunctive relief (i.e. preventing the owner of the dominant estate to continue to use the easement to access the adjacent non-dominant estate) although the plaintiff unlawfully extended the easement. Brachtenbach rationalized that a grant of injunctive relief under the circumstances would be inappropriate and against the principles of equity because (while no additional harm to the servient estate resulted from the extension of the easement) if injunctive relief was in fact given to the defendant, it would only serve to harm the plaintiff while not providing any benefit or protection to the defendant.

== Retirement and death ==
Brachtenbach retired from the bench in 1994 and returned to his home near Aberdeen before moving to Burns, Oregon.

Brachtenbach died on May 2, 2008, at his home in Cottage Grove, Oregon. He was 77 and had fought a long battle with throat cancer.
