= Gehlen House and Barn =

Historic house in Iowa, United States

- U.S. National Register of Historic Places
- U.S. Historic district – Contributing property
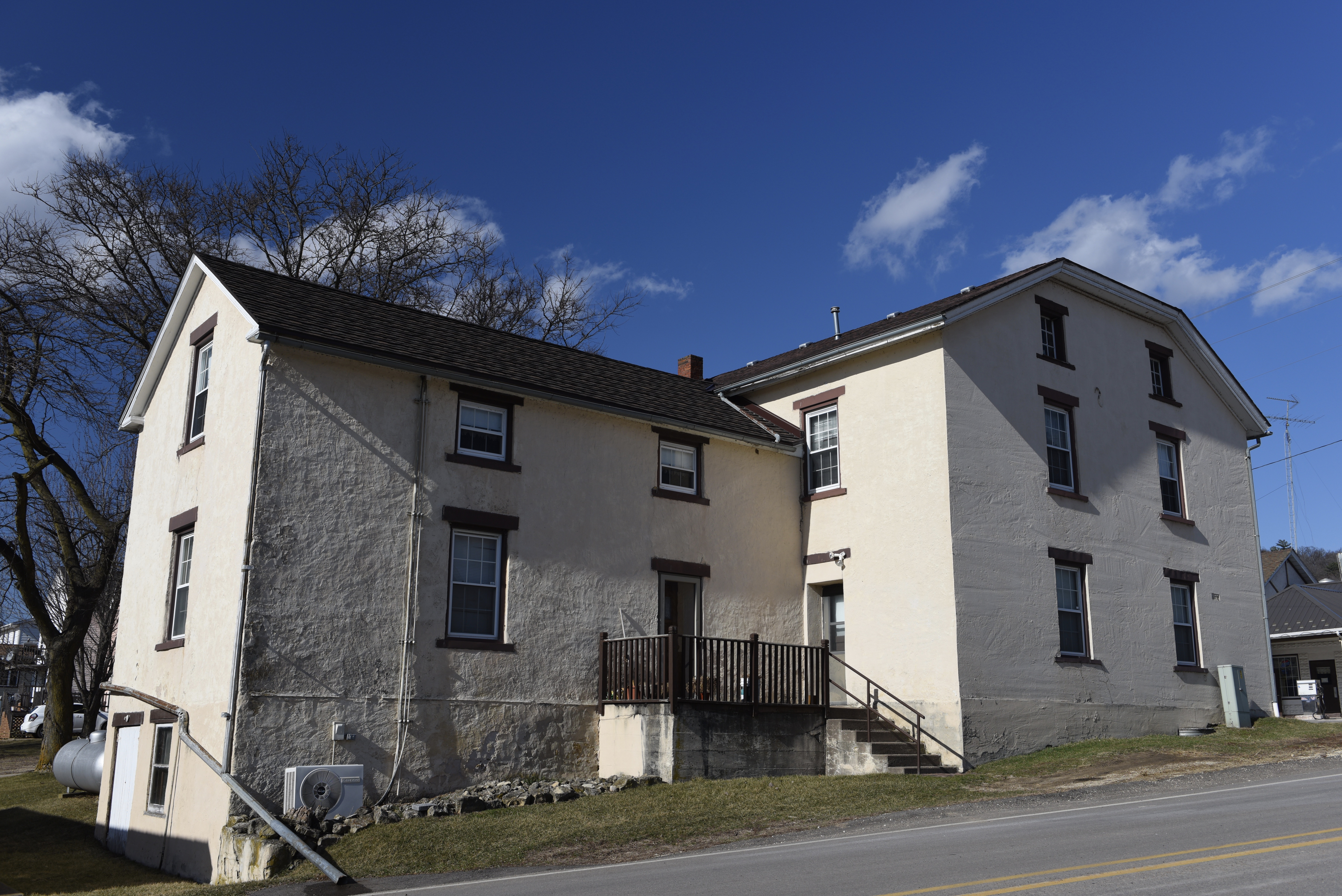
- The Gehlen house from behind.

- Location within Iowa Location within the United States
- Location: U.S. Route 52; St. Donatus, Iowa
- Coordinates: 42°21′38″N 90°32′23″W
- Area: 1 acre (0.40 ha)
- Built: 1860
- Part of: Village of St. Donatus Historic District (ID89001870)
- NRHP reference No.: 79000901
- Added to NRHP: June 18, 1979

The Gehlen House and Barn are historic buildings located in St. Donatus, Iowa, United States. Both buildings were built by Peter Gehlen (originally Jahlen), an immigrant from Luxembourg who settled in this area in 1846. He built a flour mill on the Tetes des Mortes Creek in 1848. As other immigrants from Luxembourg settled here they built distinctive houses from the local limestone. Of these the Gehlen house was the most significant. It is located at a crossroads, and because of its size it served as a community center. At one time or another it served as the post office, hotel, and general store. The exterior of the stone house is covered with plaster and features many windows and doorways on the long side, narrow eaves, a low-pitched jerkinhead, and a rear wing. The barn, which sits immediately behind the house is significant as one of the few stone barns in Iowa. The house and barn were listed on the National Register of Historic Places in 1979, and were included as contributing properties in the Village of St. Donatus Historic District in 1989.
