= Yakima Valley College =

Public college in Yakima, Washington, US

Coordinates: 46°35′11″N 120°31′41″W

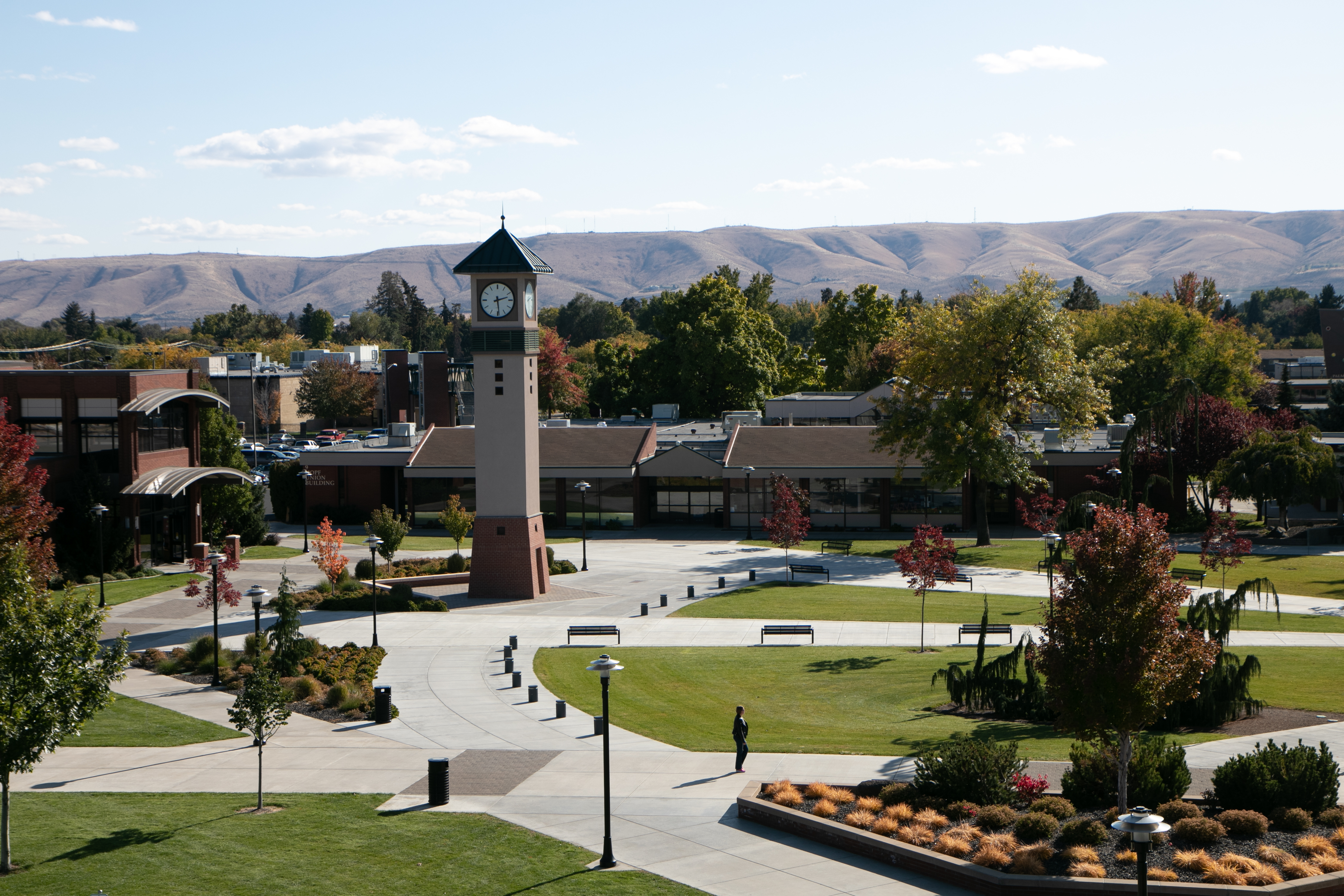
- Clocktower Plaza on Yakima Valley College's Yakima Campus
- Former name: Yakima Valley Junior College
- Type: Public college
- Established: 1928
- Accreditation: NWCCU
- President: Teresa Rich (interim)
- Students: 4,377 (Fall 2024 headcount)
- Location: Yakima, Washington, U.S.
- Colors: Red and Gold
- Nickname: Yaks
- Sporting affiliations: NWAC
- Website: www.yvcc.edu

Yakima Valley College (YVC) is a public college in Yakima, Washington. It was founded as Yakima Valley Junior College in 1928 with Elizabeth Prior serving as the institution's first president. The college offers 5 Bachelor of Applied Science degree programs, 55 associate degree programs, and more than 100 certificates of achievement.

YVC's service district covers more than 8,000 square miles (21,000 km^{2}), encompassing Yakima, Kittitas and Klickitat counties. The main campus is located at S. 16th Ave. and Nob Hill Boulevard in Yakima. There also is a campus in Grandview, and learning centers in Toppenish, Sunnyside, and Ellensburg.

== History ==
Yakima Valley College was founded in 1928 as Yakima Valley Junior College when the Yakima School District decided to create a junior college. The effort was led by Charles L. Littel, superindendent of the Yakima School District at the time. The school became the third junior college in Washington state when it opened on September 17, 1928. The college's first classes were taught at Yakima's Columbia School building and had its first graduating class in 1930.

In 1937, the college obtained land donated by the family of Yakima businessman A.E. Larson. The first building on the college's new campus was dedicated in 1949 and named after its first president, Elizabeth Prior. Prior Hall featured classrooms, administrative offices, a small bookstore, and hall for assemblies along with music practice rooms.

The school has gone through several name changes, initially using Yakima Valley Junior College from 1928 to 1961. On Sept 21, 1961, the State Board of Education officially approved their change in status from a junior college to a community college. It was reportedly Yakima Valley College from 1962 to 1977 and Yakima Valley Community College from 1977 to 2016, though both names seem to be used interchangeably over those decades. It officially became Yakima Valley College (again) effective June 1, 2016.

== Academics ==
YVC offers programs in lower-division arts and sciences, professional and technical education, adult basic education, English Language Learning, and continuing education. Offerings include five bachelors of applied science degrees, 55 associate degrees, and 100+ certificates of achievement. The college also offers Running Start, a program that enables eligible high school juniors and seniors in Washington State the opportunity to enroll in YVC classes and receive both high school and college credit with no tuition cost.

== Campus ==
Yakima Valley College has two campuses: the Yakima Campus at S. 16th Ave. and Nob Hill Boulevard in Yakima and the Grandview Campus at 500 W. Main Street in Grandview. The Yakima Campus consists of 26 buildings as well as baseball, softball, and soccer fields. The Grandview Campus consists of four buildings including the joint City of Grandview/YVC Library.

In January 2021, Yakima Valley College opened West Campus — a $22.7 million project that includes learning spaces for the college's allied health programs, Larson Gallery, a tasting room for the college's teaching winery (Yakima Valley Vintners), and a conference center.

== Athletics ==
Yakima Valley College competes in the Northwest Athletic Conference (NWAC) as the Yaks, fielding men's teams for baseball, women's teams for soccer, softball and volleyball, and men's and women's teams for basketball.

The men's basketball team has won the NWAC Championship five times (1966, 1976, 2003, 2008 and 2022) and was runner-up in 1977 and 1978; it was runner-up in the Washington State Junior College Athletic Conference (WSJCAC) Championship three times (1952, 1957 and 1958. The women’s basketball team is a three-time NWAC Championship winner (1990, 1991 and 2011) and was runner-up in 1996, 2010 and 2012.

The Yaks baseball team won the NWAC Championship eight times (1974, 1976, 1977, 1978, 1980, 1982, 1983 and 2016) and was runner-up four times (1973, 1986, 1993 and 2018); won the Washington Athletic Association of Community Colleges Championship three times (1967, 1969 and 1971) and was runner-up twice (1965 and 1970); and was WSJCAC Champion 11 times (1947, 1952-1955 and 1957-1962) and runner-up in 1956.

The volleyball team has twice finished as runner-up for the NWAC Championship (1982 and 1989) and finished third in the 2023 and 2024 NWAC Championships.

Yakima Valley's teams were known as the "Indians" prior to 1998, when the name was changed to "Yaks".

== Notable alumni ==
- MarJon Beauchamp, professional basketball player for the Philadelphia 76ers of the National Basketball Association (NBA).
- Catherine May Bedell, U.S. Representative from Washington state (six terms).
- Robert Brachtenbach, Politician and Washington State Supreme Court Justice (1972-1994).
- Robert G. Card, Businessman, engineer, U.S. Department of Energy official.
- Tom Chambers (judge), Lawyer and Washington State Supreme Court Associate Justice (2000-2012).
- Lorena González (Seattle politician), lawyer and former member of the Seattle City Council.
- Gloria Mendoza, Politician.
- Sid Morrison, Politician.
- Elaine Ostrander, Geneticist.
- Pete Rademacher, American heavyweight boxer and Olympic Gold Medalist (1956).
- David H. Shinn, American diplomat.
- Mel Stottlemyre Sr., Professional baseball player and coach.
- Christopher Wiehl, Actor.
- Lis Wiehl, Television personality, author, lawyer, radio and podcast host.
