= Arthur Galan AG =

Australian fashion brand

- Type: Fashion brand
- Industry: Fashion
- Founded: 1998
- Founders: Arthur Galan
- Headquarters: Melbourne, Australia

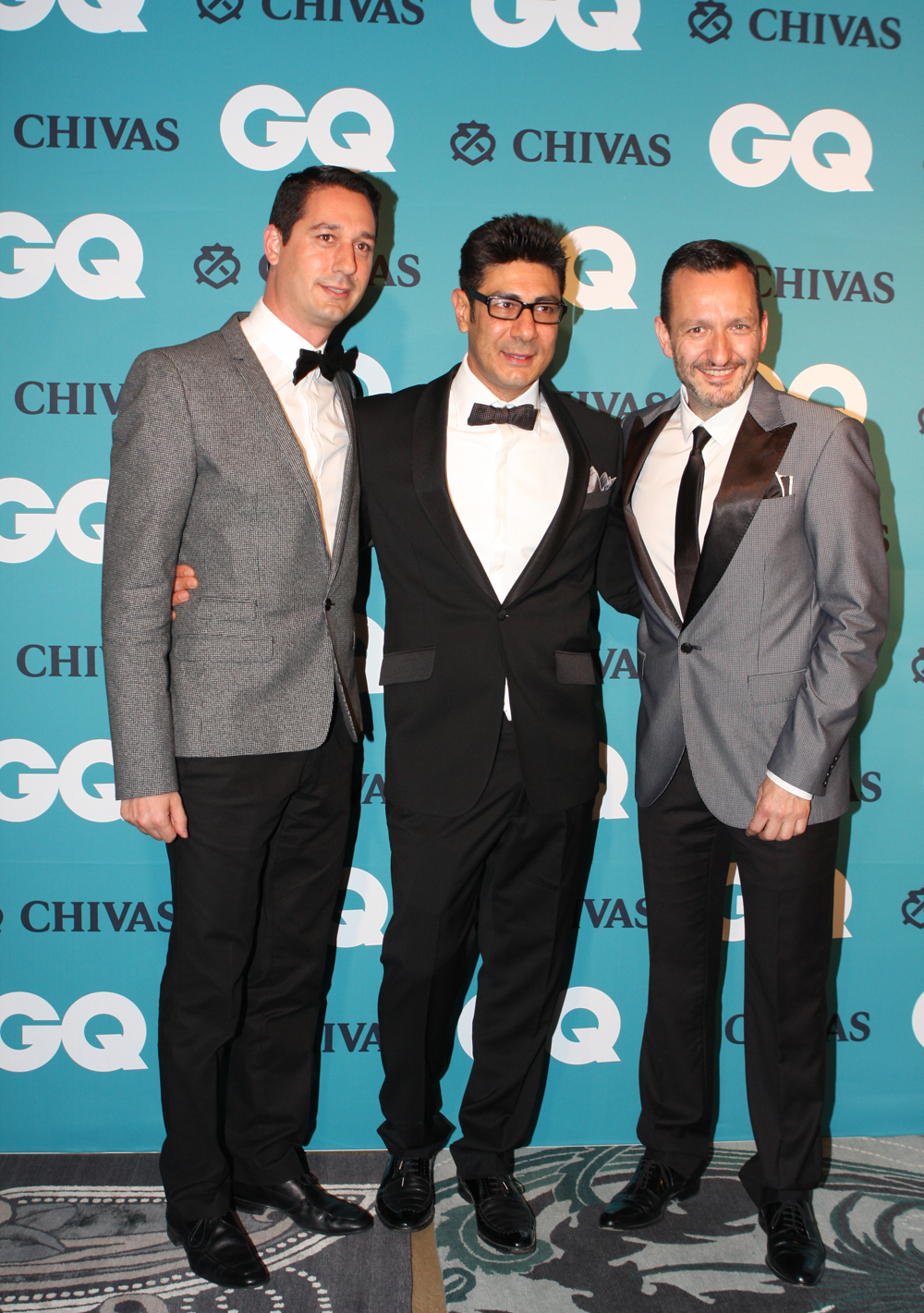
On the right:Arthur Galan (2012)

Arthur Galan AG is an Australian fashion brand based in Melbourne with menswear and womenswear lines. It is more popular for its menswear and is regularly featured in Australian men's fashion magazine, GQ Australia.

== History ==
Arthur Galan AG is famous for its paisley shirts. The menswear line was launched in 1998. Its wear line was launched in March 2006. This brand is designed by Arthur Galan. Arthur Galan AG has five menswear stores in Melbourne and Sydney. There are also two wear stores in Melbourne and one in Sydney.

== Availability ==
Arthur Galan AG's menswear and womenswear was originally sold at David Jones department stores in Australia but switched to rival Myer, following an agreement announced in January 2011.

AG is also available internationally, with stockists in New Zealand, Hong Kong (Lane Crawford and Harvey Nichols) and Singapore (Tangs).

== See also ==
- Camilla and Marc
