= Clemens August Graf von Galen =

German Catholic bishop and cardinal (1878–1946)

Blessed Clemens August Graf von Galen
- Cardinal, Bishop of Münster
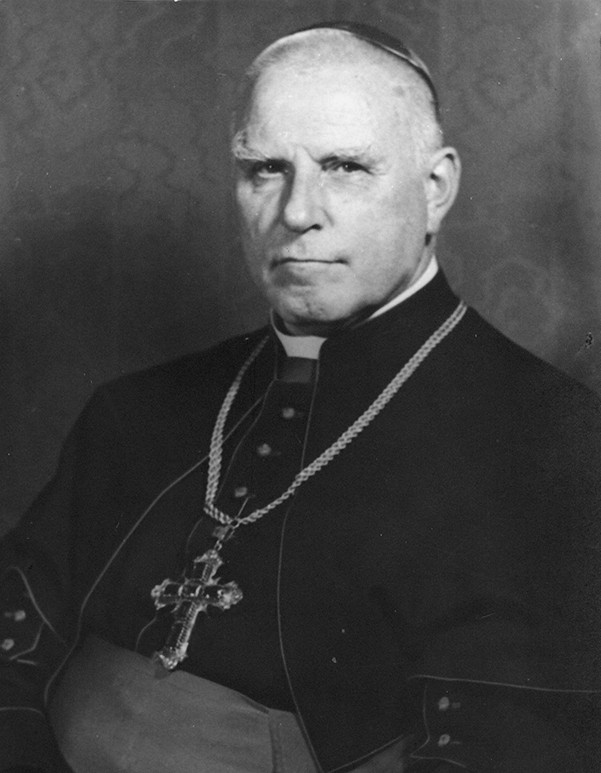
- Portrait of Galen
- Church: Latin Church
- Diocese: Münster
- Appointed: 5 September 1933
- Term ended: 22 March 1946
- Predecessor: Johannes Poggenburg
- Successor: Michael Keller

Orders
- Ordination: 28 May 1904 by Hermann Dingelstadt
- Consecration: 28 October 1933 by Karl Joseph Schulte
- Created cardinal: 21 February 1946 by Pope Pius XII
- Rank: Cardinal-Priest

Personal details
- Born: Clemens August Graf von Galen; 16 March 1878 Dinklage Castle, Dinklage, Oldenburg, Germany
- Died: 22 March 1946 (aged 68) Münster, Westphalia, Germany
- Buried: Münster Cathedral
- Motto: Nec laudibus nec timore (neither by flattery nor by fear)
- Coat of arms

Sainthood
- Feast day: 22 March
- Venerated in: Catholic Church
- Beatified: 9 October 2005; Saint Peter's Basilica, Vatican City by Pope Benedict XVI

Clemens Augustinus Emmanuel Joseph Pius Anthonius Hubertus Marie Graf von Galen (16 March 1878 – 22 March 1946), better known as Clemens August Graf von Galen, was a German count, Bishop of Münster, and cardinal of the Catholic Church. During World War II, Galen led Catholic protests against Nazi euthanasia and denounced Gestapo lawlessness and the persecution of the Church in Nazi Germany. He was appointed a cardinal by Pope Pius XII in 1946, shortly before his death, and was beatified by Pope Benedict XVI in 2005.

Born into the German aristocracy, Galen received part of his education in Austria-Hungary from the Jesuits at Stella Matutina in the town of Feldkirch. After his ordination, he worked in Berlin at St. Matthias. He intensely disliked the secular liberal values of the Weimar Republic. A monarchist, he considered the Treaty of Versailles unjust and viewed Bolshevism as a threat to Germany and the Church. He espoused the stab-in-the-back theory: that the German military was defeated in 1918 only because it had been undermined by defeatist elements on the home front. Despite his later opposition to Nazi persecution of the Catholic Church, he participated in a 1923 meeting of Catholic German aristocrats which affirmed the "inner truth" of the Protocols of the Elders of Zion and the inability of Jews to assimilate to German culture. He expressed his opposition to secularism in his 1932 book Die Pest des Laizismus und ihre Erscheinungsformen (The Plague of Laicism and its Forms of Expression). After serving in Berlin parishes from 1906 to 1929, he became the pastor of Münster's St. Lamberti Church, where he was noted for his political conservatism before being appointed Bishop of Münster in 1933.

Galen began to criticize Hitler's movement in 1934. He condemned the Nazi "worship of race" in a pastoral letter on 29 January 1934, and assumed responsibility for the publication of a collection of essays which fiercely criticized Nazi ideologist Alfred Rosenberg and defended the teachings of the Catholic Church. He was an outspoken critic of the euthanasia policies and anti-Catholicism of the Nazis and helped draft Pope Pius XI's 1937 anti-Nazi encyclical Mit brennender Sorge. Nevertheless, he did not publicly condemn the Nazi persecution of Jews. In 1941, von Galen delivered three sermons in which he denounced the arrest of Jesuits, the confiscation of church property, Nazi attacks on the Church, and in the third, fiercely condemned the state-approved mass killing in the involuntary euthanasia programme of persons with mental or physical disabilities (Aktion T4). The sermons were illegally circulated in print, inspiring some German Resistance groups, including the White Rose.

Following this, in September 1943, another condemnation was read at the order of von Galen and other bishops from all Catholic pulpits in the diocese of Münster and across Nazi Germany, denouncing the killing of "the innocent and defenceless mentally handicapped and mentally ill, the incurably infirm and fatally wounded, innocent hostages and disarmed prisoners of war and criminal offenders, people of a foreign race or descent".

== Early years ==
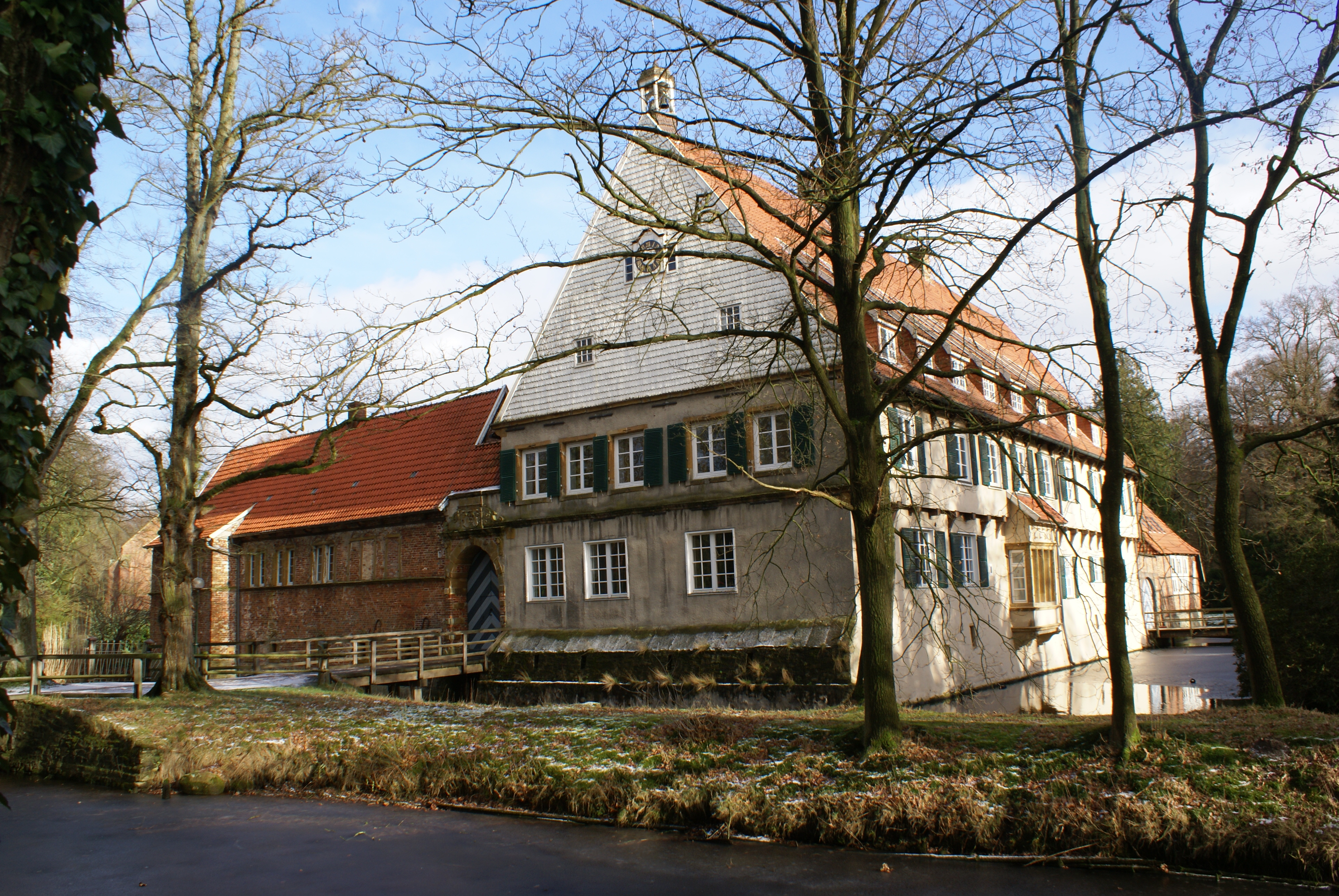
Galen was one of 13 children born to an old aristocratic family in Burg Dinklage.

Clemens August Graf von Galen was born in Dinklage, on 16 March 1878, the eleventh of thirteen children of Reichstag minister Ferdinand Heribert Graf von Galen of the Catholic Centre Party and his wife Elisabeth Gräfin von Spee. He was born into the Westphalian noble family von Galen. Christoph Bernhard von Galen (* 1606, † 1678), Prince-bishop of Münster, was his great-great-great-great-granduncle, and the social activist bishop Wilhelm Emmanuel von Ketteler (* 1811, † 1877) was his great-uncle. His upbringing at home is described by historians as strict, focused on faith, order, punctuality, and diligence. His mother was noted for her ascetic attitude, writing to her son on his name day in 1891: "Life is so short, and we are to purchase such a glorious eternity with it; not a day can be lost in securing this goal and doing something for God, no matter what position it may be."

Until 1890, Clemens August and his brother Franz were tutored at home. At a time when the Jesuits were still not permitted in Münster, he received his main schooling at a Jesuit School, Stella Matutina in the Vorarlberg, Austria, where only Latin was spoken. He was not an easy student to teach, and his Jesuit superior wrote to his parents: "Infallibility is the main problem with Clemens, who under no circumstance will admit that he may be wrong. It is always his teachers and educators who are wrong.

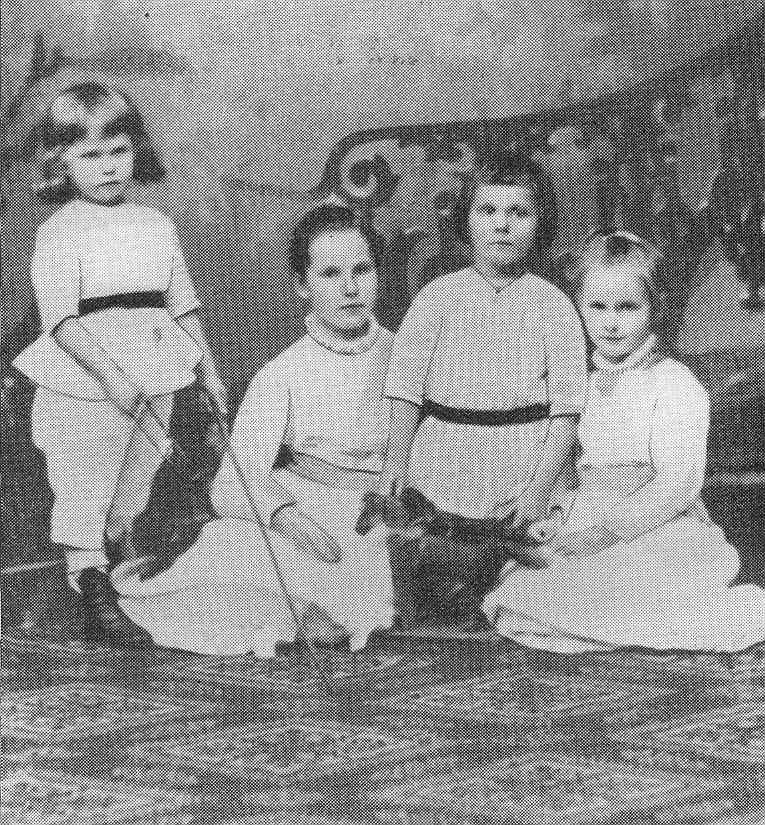
Clemens August (third from left) at age six

Because Prussia did not recognize the Stella Matutina academy, Clemens returned home in 1894 to attend a public school in Vechta and by 1896 both Clemens and Franz had passed the examinations that qualified them to attend a university. Upon graduation, his fellow students wrote in his yearbook: "Clemens doesn't make love or go drinking, he does not like worldly deceit." In 1896 he went to study at the Catholic University of Freiburg, which had been established in 1886 by the Dominicans, where he encountered the writings of Thomas Aquinas. In 1897 he began to study a variety of topics, including literature, history, and philosophy. One of his teachers was history professor and noted biblical archaeologist Johann Peter Kirsch. Following their first winter semester at Freiburg, Clemens and Franz visited Rome for three months. At the end of the visit he told Franz that he had decided to become a priest though he was unsure whether to become a contemplative Benedictine or a Jesuit. In 1899 he met Pope Leo XIII in a private audience. He studied at the Theological Faculty and Convent in Innsbruck, founded in 1669 by the Jesuits, where scholastic philosophy was emphasized, and new concepts and ideas avoided. Galen left Innsbruck in 1903 to enter the seminary in Münster and was ordained a priest on 28 May 1904 by Bishop Hermann Dingelstadt. At first he worked for a family member, the Auxiliary Bishop of Münster, as Chaplain. Soon he moved to Berlin, where he worked as parish priest at St. Matthias.

== Berlin (1906–1929) ==
Galen arrived to see Berlin on a quick visit on 23 April 1906 and stayed until 16 April 1929. Germany's capital contained districts of Protestant elites, a Catholic community composed of primarily working-class people and a Jewish community of both middle-class and poorer immigrants. It was a booming commercial and cultural metropolis at the time he arrived — its population increased from 900,000 in 1871 to slightly less than 4 million by 1920. Religion did not bring the community together — "religion and fears of a loss of religious belief came to be a major source of internal division." For the working class, Catholicism and Social Democracy competed for allegiance. In this atmosphere, Galen sought to be an energetic and idealistic leader of his parish. He made visits to the sick and poor, became president of the Catholic Young Men's Association, gave religious instruction in the schools, and for his efforts he was named Papa Galen by the parishioners he served. A commanding presence (6 feet 7 inches (2.01 m) tall) — his rooms were furnished simply, he wore unpretentious clothing, and he spoke plainly — he did not like the theatre, secular music (except for military marches), or literature. His only reported vice, which he refused to give up, was smoking his pipes.

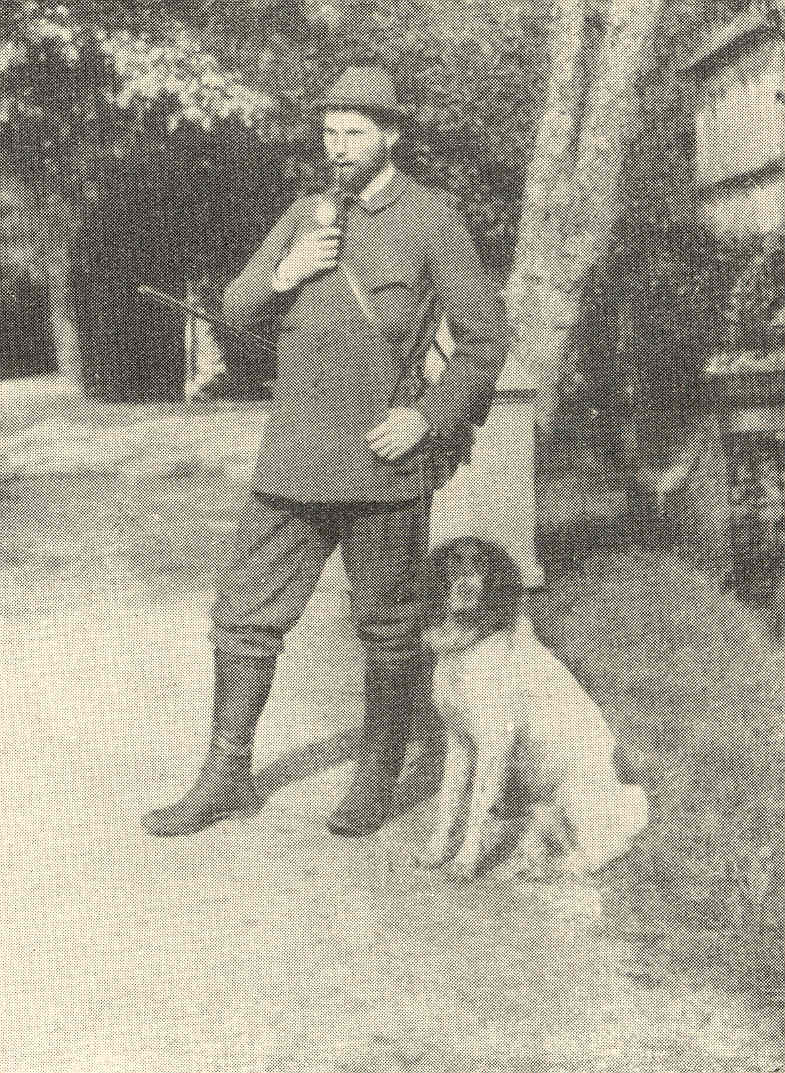
Galen in 1899 after a hunt

During the First World War, Galen volunteered for military service in order to demonstrate his loyalty to the Kaiser. As parish priest, he encouraged his parishioners to serve their country willingly. In August 1917 he visited the front lines in France and found the optimistic morale of the troops uplifting. "Feelings of German nationalism, apparently, could triumph over concern for the violations of the sanctity of human life in war." In 1916 and 1917 he welcomed reports that the German military had a plan to colonize Eastern Europe, stating that German Catholics should be moved into the area, especially Lithuania, with the goal not of expelling the Lithuanians, but educating them to think and feel as Germans.

Following the German surrender in November 1918, Galen, still in Berlin, worked to create soup kitchens, aid societies, and clothing drives to deal with immediate problems of hunger and poverty. He feared the lower classes would embrace radicalism and anarchy. Galen deplored the fall of the monarchy and was suspicious of the new Weimar democracy, believing that "the revolutionary ideas of 1918 had caused considerable damage to Catholic Christianity." He believed the stab-in-the-back myth, which held that the German Army had not been defeated in battle but by being undermined by defeatist elements on the home front and, as did most Germans, considered the Treaty of Versailles unjust.

Throughout the Weimar years he remained on the right of German politics. He often criticized the Centre Party for being too left-wing. Galen openly supported the Protestant Paul von Hindenburg against the Centre Party's candidate, Wilhelm Marx, in the presidential elections of 1925. Galen was known as a fierce anti-Communist (he later supported the battle by the Axis powers on the Eastern Front against Joseph Stalin's regime in the Soviet Union).

In 1923, he participated in a meeting of the Verein katholischer Edelleute Deutschlands, which was chaired by his brother Franz von Galen. Other participants included Martin Spahn and Franz von Papen. The minutes summarized the participants' views on the Jewish question. According to the minutes, the accusations of the Protocols of the Elders of Zion were considered plausible due to their "inner truth," the assimilation of Jewry and Germandom was deemed impossible because of the intrinsic incompatibility between "German nature" and the "Jewish Spirit", and the fight against Judaism did not contradict Catholic principles, because “since Christ’s death the Jews are the rejected people, God’s scourge, the main representatives of materialism, decomposition, of anti-Christendom.”

His views on Communism were largely formed as a consequence of the Stalinization and relentless persecution of Christians within the Soviet Union after 1918, during which virtually all Catholic bishops were either killed or forced underground. He also expressed his opposition to modernity in his 1932 publication, Die Pest des Laizismus und ihre Erscheinungsformen (The Plague of Laicism and its Forms of Expression).

== Münster ==
Galen became the pastor of St. Lambert's Church, Münster, where he initially upset some parishioners with his political conservatism. At a meeting in Münster of the Association of Catholic Academicians in June 1933, Galen spoke against those scholars who had criticised the Nazi government and called for "a just and objective evaluation of [Hitler's] new political movement". In 1933, Galen was elected bishop of Münster, although he was not the popular candidate to succeed the previous bishop, Johannes Poggenburg, and was selected only after other candidates had declined to be nominated and despite a protest from the Papal Nuncio Cesare Orsenigo, who reported that Galen was bossy and paternalistic in his public utterances. In October 1933, Galen wrote approvingly of the Nazis' efforts to "eradicate" the "open propaganda for godlessness and immorality".

Galen was named bishop by Pope Pius XI on 5 September 1933. On 28 October, he was consecrated as bishop in Münster's cathedral by Cardinal Karl Joseph Schulte. He chose as his motto "Nec laudibus nec timore", a phrase from the liturgy used for a bishop's consecration when the consecrating bishop prays that the new bishop be overcome "neither by flattery nor by fear". As bishop, Galen campaigned against the totalitarian approach of the Nazi Party in national education, appealing to parents to insist on Catholic teaching in schools. Citing the recently agreed-upon Reichskonkordat assurance that the Church had the right to determine its own religious instruction, he successfully forced the Nazis to permit continued Catholic instruction in Catholic schools. It was one of the first instances where the Reichskonkordat was used by the Church against the government, which was one of the intentions of Pope Pius XI.

In 1933, when the Nazi school superintendent of Münster issued a decree that religious instruction be combined with discussion of the "demoralising power" of the "people of Israel", Galen refused, writing that such interference in the school curriculum was a breach of the Concordat and that he feared children would be confused as to their "obligation to act with charity to all men" and as to the historical mission of the people of Israel. Galen often protested against violations of the Concordat to Hitler directly. In 1936, when the Nazis removed crucifixes from schools, Galen's protest led to a public demonstration. Together with Munich's Cardinal Faulhaber and Berlin's Bishop Preysing, Galen helped to draft Pope Pius XI's anti-Nazi encyclical Mit brennender Sorge (With Burning Concern) of 1937.

In 1934, Bishop Galen began to attack the racial ideology of the Nazi regime, partly poking fun at it, partly critiquing its ideological basis as presented by the Nazi ideologist Alfred Rosenberg. He declared it unacceptable to argue that Jewish authorship of the Old Testament diminished its authority, or that morality and virtue were in any way derived from the perceived usefulness of a particular race. In January 1934, he criticized Nazi racial policy in a sermon and, in subsequent homilies, equated unquestioning loyalty to the Reich with "slavery". He spoke against Hitler's theory of the purity of German blood. Bishop Galen also derided the neo-pagan theories of Rosenberg in The Myth of the Twentieth Century as perhaps no more than "an occasion for laughter in the educated world", but warned that Rosenberg's "immense importance lies in the acceptance of his basic notions as the authentic philosophy of National Socialism and in his almost unlimited power in the field of German education. Herr Rosenberg must be taken seriously if the German situation is to be understood."

In retaliation, two senior SS officers visited Galen to pressure him into endorsing Rosenberg's doctrines publicly, threatening the confiscation of Church property and an anti-Catholic propaganda campaign. One of them was the future SS General Jürgen Stroop, who later recalled, "Bishop von Galen was a great gentleman, a true aristocrat, a Renaissance prince of the Church. He welcomed us politely but with reserve." Galen began by commending Stroop's mother for her devout Catholicism, then categorically refused to accept or praise Rosenberg's doctrines of euthanizing or forcibly sterilizing disabled people. He denounced the Nazis for trying to introduce Germanic neo-paganism into his diocese. He scoffed at marriage ceremonies and funerals conducted before altars dedicated to Wotan, surprising Stroop, who had attended such a ceremony only days before. Galen closed by assuring the officers that the Church would remain loyal to the state in all lawful matters. He expressed his deep love for Germany and reminded them that he had been the first bishop to publicly acknowledge the new regime. In Stroop's view, Galen's German patriotism "was tainted by Papist ideals, which have been harmful to Germany for centuries. Besides, the Archbishop's orders came from outside the Fatherland, a fact which disturbed us. We all know that despite its diverse factions, the Catholic Church is a world community, which sticks together when the chips are down."

In June 1935 he delivered a sermon that connected the heresy of the Anabaptists to the "sins of the Jews". He told his audience that "whoever does not listen to the Church is a heathen and officially is a sinner". He described how "the Israelites debased the Savior", and how people who resisted Jesus as the Christ appeared on the "side of the blinded Jews". He equated the rejection of Christianity with rejection of worldly authority, leading to anarchy and chaos. He pointed to the Russians also as among those who had not respected God-given authority. Galen did not protest the antisemitic 1935 Nuremberg Laws, or the Kristallnacht pogrom of 1938. Until his death, he refused to admit that referring to Jews as "degenerate", "rejected", and "lost" or labeling anarchism, communism, socialism or liberalism as "Jewish", in any way aided the Nazi regime or and its racist antisemitism.

By late 1935, Galen was urging a joint pastoral letter from the German bishops to protest about an "underground war" against the church. By early 1937, the church hierarchy in Germany, which had initially attempted to co-operate with the Nazi government, had become highly disillusioned. In March, Pope Pius XI issued the encyclical Mit brennender Sorge (With Burning Concern), accusing the Nazi government of violating the 1933 Concordat and of sowing the "tales of suspicion, discord, hatred, calumny, of secret and open fundamental hostility to Christ and His Church". Galen was part of the five-member commission that prepared the papal encyclical. The Nazis responded with an intensification of their campaign against the Catholic Church. There were mass arrests of clergy and church publishing houses were expropriated, followed by widely spread abuse allegations and staged morality trials against members of religious orders and priests.

In 1941 Galen welcomed the German war against the USSR as a positive development as he had rallied also to the cause of Germany when Hitler invaded Poland, offering a patriotic benediction.

=== Euthanasia ===
Coat of Arms of Cardinal von Galen

While the Nazi extermination of Jewish people took place primarily on Polish territory, the murder of people with disabilities (viewed by the Nazi regime as "invalid" individuals) became public knowledge because it took place on German soil and interfered directly in Catholic and Protestant welfare institutions. Church leaders who opposed it – chiefly Bishop Galen and Theophil Wurm, the Lutheran Bishop of Württemberg – were able to rouse widespread public opposition. The regime initiated its euthanasia program in 1939. It targeted people with dementia, cognitive/mental disabilities, mental illness, epileptic, physical disabilities, children with Down's Syndrome and people with similar afflictions. The programme systematically murdered more than 70,000 people between September 1939 and August 1941. After 1941 the killing continued unofficially, with the total number of deaths estimated at 200,000.

In 1941, with the Wehrmacht still marching on Moscow, Galen, despite his long-time nationalist sympathies, denounced the lawlessness of the Gestapo, the confiscations of church properties, and the Nazi euthanasia programme. He attacked the Gestapo for converting church properties to their own purposes – including use as cinemas and brothels. He protested the mistreatment of Catholics in Germany: the arrests and imprisonment without legal process, the suppression of monasteries, and the expulsion of religious orders. But his sermons went further than defending the church; he spoke of a moral danger to Germany from the regime's violations of basic human rights: "the right to life, to inviolability, and to freedom is an indispensable part of any moral social order", he said – and any government that punishes without court proceedings "undermines its own authority and respect for its sovereignty within the conscience of its citizens". Galen said that it was the duty of Christians to resist the taking of human life, even if it meant losing their own lives.

Hitler's order for the Aktion T4 Euthanasia Programme was dated 1 September 1939, the day Germany invaded Poland. As word of the programme spread, protest grew, until finally, Galen delivered his famous August 1941 sermons denouncing the programme as "murder". On 3 August 1941, in one of his series of denunciations, Galen declared:

"Thou shalt not kill." God engraved this commandment on the souls of men long before any penal code... God has engraved these commandments in our hearts... They are the unchangeable and fundamental truths of our social life... Where in Germany and where, here, is obedience to the precepts of God? [...] As for the first commandment, "Thou shalt not have strange gods before me," instead of the One, True, Eternal God, men have created at the dictates of their whim, their own gods to adore: Nature, the State, the Nation, or the Race.

=== 1941 sermons ===
Galen's three powerful sermons of July and August 1941 earned him the nickname of the "Lion of Münster". The sermons were printed and distributed illegally. Hitler wanted to have Galen removed as a bishop, but Goebbels told him this would result in the loss of the loyalty of the population of Westphalia. The sermons protested against Nazi policies such as Gestapo terror, euthanasia, forced sterilization, and concentration camps. His attacks on the Nazis were so severe that Nazi official Walter Tiessler proposed in a letter to Martin Bormann that Galen should be executed.

On 13 July 1941, Galen attacked the regime for its Gestapo tactics of terror, including disappearances without trial, the closure of Catholic institutions without any stated justifications, and the resultant fear imposed on all Germans. The Gestapo, he argued, reduced even the most decent and loyal citizens to fear of ending up in a cellar prison or a concentration camp. Even though the country was at war, Galen rejected the notion that his speech undermined German solidarity or unity. Quoting Pope Pius XII's Opus Justitiae Pax and Justitia fundamentum Regnorum, Galen noted that "Peace is the work of Justice and Justice, the basis for dominion", then attacked the Third Reich for undermining justice, the belief in justice and for reducing the German people to a state of permanent fear, even cowardice. He concluded: "As a German, as a decent citizen, I demand Justice".

In a second sermon on 20 July 1941, Galen said that all written protests against the Nazi hostilities had proved to be useless. The confiscation of religious institutions continued unabated. Members of religious orders were still being deported or jailed. He asked his listeners to be patient and to endure, and said that the German people were being destroyed not by the Allied bombing from the outside, but from negative forces within.

On 3 August 1941, Galen's third sermon described the continued desecration of Catholic churches, the closing and confiscation of convents and monasteries, and the deportation of mentally ill people to undisclosed destinations, while a notice was sent to family members stating that the person in question had died. This is murder, he exclaimed, unlawful by divine and German law, a rejection of the laws of God. He said he had forwarded his evidence to the State Attorney. "These are people, our brothers and sisters; maybe their life is unproductive, but productivity is not a justification for killing." If that were indeed a justification for execution, he reasoned, everybody would have to be afraid to even go to a doctor for fear of what might be discovered. The social fabric would be affected. Galen then remarked that a regime which can do away with the Fifth Commandment ("Thou shalt not kill.") can destroy the other commandments as well. Galen went on to raise the question of whether permanently injured German soldiers would fall under the programme as well.

Thousands of copies of the sermons were circulated throughout Germany. The resulting local protests in Germany broke the secrecy that had surrounded the euthanasia programme known as Aktion T4. The local Nazi Gauleiter was furious and demanded Galen's immediate arrest. Joseph Goebbels and party pragmatists preferred to wait until the end of hostilities to avoid undermining German morale in a heavily Catholic area. A year later, the euthanasia programme was still active, but the regime was conducting it in greater secrecy.

According to Robert Jay Lifton, "[t]his powerful, populist sermon was immediately reproduced and distributed throughout Germany — indeed, it was dropped among German troops by British Royal Air Force flyers. Galen's sermon probably had a greater impact than any other one statement in consolidating anti-'euthanasia' sentiment." Howard K. Smith called Galen "heroic", writing that the movement he represented was so widespread that the Nazi government could not arrest the bishop. Ian Kershaw called Galen's "open attack" on the government's euthanasia programme in 1941 a "vigorous denunciation of Nazi inhumanity and barbarism". According to Anton Gill, "Galen used his condemnation of this appalling policy to draw wider conclusions about the nature of the Nazi state."

The sermons inspired various people in the German Resistance. The Lübeck martyrs distributed von Galen's sermons. The sermons influenced the Scholl siblings in founding the White Rose pacifist student resistance group. One of von Galen's sermons of 1941 was the group's first pamphlet. Generalmajor Hans Oster, a devout Lutheran and a leading member of the German Resistance, once said of Galen:

He's a man of courage and conviction. And what resolution in his sermons! There should be a handful of such people in all our churches, and at least two handfuls in the Wehrmacht. If there were, Germany would look quite different!

Galen suffered virtual house arrest from 1941 until the end of the war. Documents suggest the Nazis intended to hang him at the end of the war. In a Table Talk from 1942, Hitler said: "The fact that I remain silent in public over Church affairs is not in the least misunderstood by the sly foxes of the Catholic Church, and I am quite sure that a man like Bishop von Galen knows full well that after the war I shall extract retribution to the last farthing".

Despite Galen's opposition to Nazism and its racial theories, he nonetheless believed Germany was the last bulwark against the spread of atheist Bolshevism. Parts of a sermon he gave in 1943 are said to have been used by the Nazis to aid in the enlistment of Dutch men to voluntarily join the Waffen SS against the Soviet Union. Galen feared that German Catholics were being relegated to second-class status in Hitler's Germany and believed Hitler was missing the point that the Catholic Church and the state could be aligned against Bolshevism. Although von Galen boldly spoke out against Nazi policies and the euthanasia programme, historian Beth A. Griech-Polelle wrote that Galen remained silent on other issues such as the roundup, deportation and mass murder of Jews. German historian Joachim Kuropka dismissed this allegation as a "misjudgment". Kuropka, referring to Wilhelm Damberg's discovery which in his opinion had not received enough attention so far, pointed out that the diocesan leadership in Münster had instructed all its pastors in June 1938 to recommend a brochure against anti-Semitism titled "The Nathanael Question of Our Days" ("Die Nathanaelfrage unserer Tage") to all faithful to read. Kuropka also emphasized Galen's cordial personal relationship with Münster town rabbi Fritz Steinthal.

According to Kuropka, while there was no evidence in church archives for the rabbi's statement made from memory that after the Kristallnacht, by order of Galen, prayers for the Jews were said in all the churches of the Diocese of Münster, Kuropka was able to cite confirmatory evidence from Rhineland Gestapo files. Kuropka emphasized the uniqueness of the brochure distribution and the prayer campaign in Galen's diocese of Münster. However, like other bishops, according to Kuropka, Galen missed the right time to "escape into the public eye" on the question of the persecution of the Jews, for which Galen later reportedly blamed himself by his own admission.

Apart from official pronouncements on the subject by the Pope and by German church bodies, Galen himself denounced Nazi racism on multiple occasions, and he was partly responsible for the German bishops' conference condemnation of racial persecution in the 1943 pastoral letter Dekalog-Hirtenbrief. After the war, Münster rabbi Fritz Steinthal recorded Galen's support after Kristallnacht, while expressing his firm conviction as rabbi that most Catholics in his city of Münster were horrified by the pogrom and in fact feared that they would be the next victims. During a commemoration in 2012, Jewish Holocaust survivor and witness Hans Kaufmann of Münster reminded of the fact that von Galen had offered a helping hand to Steinthal after the 1938 Kristallnacht, but deplored that other Jewish victims in Münster did not receive much aid from neighbours the day after.

While not as explicit and not as effective as the vocal German episcopate's 1941 protests, in September 1943, von Galen and his fellow bishops in Germany drafted another condemnation of Nazi racial persecution and ordered it to be read from all pulpits in the diocese of Münster and across Germany, therein denouncing the killing of "the innocent and defenceless mentally handicapped and mentally ill, the incurably infirm and fatally wounded, innocent hostages and disarmed prisoners of war and criminal offenders, people of foreign race or descent".

In his history of the German Resistance, Theodore S. Hamerow characterised the resistance approach of Galen as "trying to influence the Third Reich from within". While some clergymen refused ever to feign support for the regime, in the Church's conflict with the State over ecclesiastical autonomy, the Catholic hierarchy adopted a strategy of "seeming acceptance of the Third Reich", by couching their criticisms as motivated merely by a desire to "point out mistakes that some of its overzealous followers committed" in order to strengthen the government. Thus when Bishop Galen delivered his famous 1941 denunciations of Nazi euthanasia and the lawlessness of the Gestapo, he also said that the Church had never sought the "overthrow of the Reich government".

== Post-war positions ==
After the war, Galen protested against the mistreatment of the German population by Allied occupation forces. On 13 April 1945, he raised a protest with American military authorities against the mass rape of German women by Red Army soldiers as well as against the plundering of German homes, factories, research centres, firms and offices by American and British troops.

In a joint interview with British officials, Galen told the international press that "just as I fought against Nazi injustices, I will fight any injustice, no matter where it comes from". He repeated these claims in a sermon on 1 July 1945, which was copied and illegally distributed throughout occupied Germany. The British authorities ordered him to renounce the sermon immediately, but the bishop refused. In the face of his resistance and broad popularity, they allowed him free speech without any censorship. In an interview with Swiss media, Galen demanded punishment for Nazi criminals but humane treatment for the millions of German prisoners of war who had not committed any crimes and who were being denied contact with their relatives by the British. He criticized the British dismissal of Germans from public service without investigation and trial. He forcefully condemned the expulsion of German civilians from former German provinces and territories in the east annexed by communist Poland and the Soviet Union.

A paper from the British Foreign Office called Galen "the most outstanding personality among the clergy in the British zone... Statuesque in appearance and uncompromising in discussion, this oak-bottomed old aristocrat... is a German nationalist through and through."

When SS-General Kurt Meyer, accused of complicity in the shooting of 18 Canadian prisoners of war, was sentenced to death, Galen pleaded for his life to be spared: "According to what has been reported to me, General Kurt Meyer was sentenced to death because his subordinates committed crimes he didn't arrange and of which he did not approve. As a proponent of Christian legal opinion, which states that you are only responsible for your own deeds, I support the plea for clemency for General Meyer and pledge for a pardon." On second review, a Canadian general, finding only "a mass of circumstantial evidence", commuted Meyer's death sentence to imprisonment. Meyer served nine years in British and Canadian military prisons.

== College of Cardinals ==
Unexpectedly, at Christmas 1945 it became known that Pope Pius XII would appoint three new German cardinals: Bishop Clemens August von Galen, Bishop Konrad von Preysing of Berlin, and Archbishop Josef Frings of Cologne. Despite numerous British obstacles and denial of air travel, Galen arrived in Rome on 5 February 1946. American cardinals financed his Roman stay, as German money was not in demand. He had become famous and popular, so after the pope had placed the red hat on his head with the words "God bless you, God bless Germany," Saint Peter's Basilica for minutes thundered in "triumphant applause" for Galen.

He was created Cardinal-Priest of San Bernardo alle Terme on 18 February 1946 by Pius XII.

While in Rome, he visited the German POW camps in Taranto and told the German Wehrmacht soldiers that he would take care of their release, and that the Pope himself was working on the release of POWs. He took a large number of comforting personal messages to their worried families.

After receiving the red hat, Galen went to see Madre Pascalina, the servant of the Pope. He told her that the Pope had quoted long passages from Galen's 1941 sermons from memory and how the Pope thanked him for his courage. Galen told the Pope, "Yes, Holy Father, but many of my very best priests died in concentration camps because they distributed my sermons." Pius replied that he was always aware that thousands of innocent persons would have been sent to certain death if he as pope had protested. They talked about the old days in Berlin, and Galen declared: "For nothing in the world would I want to have missed those two hours, not even for the red hat."

== Death and beatification ==
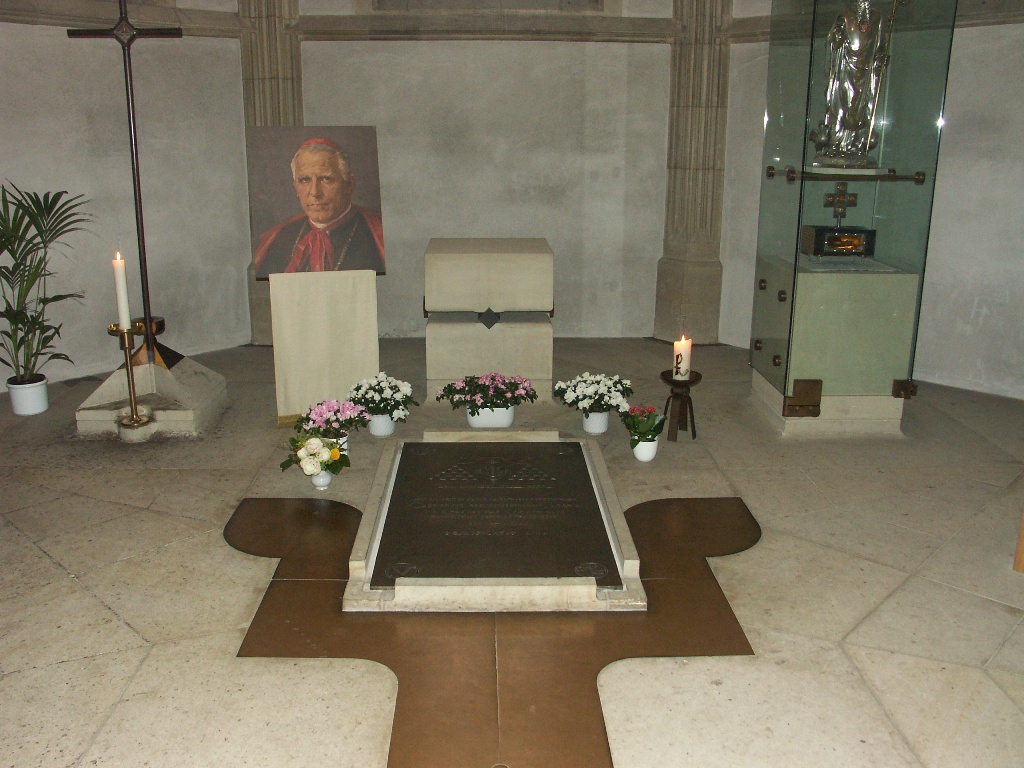
Galen's tomb in Münster Cathedral

Following his return from the Vatican City, the new cardinal was celebrated enthusiastically in his native Westphalia and in the destroyed city of Münster. He died a few days after his return from Rome in the St. Franziskus Hospital of Münster due to an appendix infection diagnosed too late. His last words were: "Yes, Yes, as God wills it. May God reward you for it. May God protect the dear fatherland. Go on working for Him... oh, you dear Saviour!" He was buried in the family crypt of the Galen family in the destroyed Cathedral of Münster.

The cause for beatification was requested by his successor, Bishop Michael Keller of Münster, and began under Pope Pius XII in 1956. It was concluded positively in November 2004 under Pope John Paul II. Clemens August Graf von Galen was beatified outside St. Peter's Basilica by Pope Benedict XVI on 9 October 2005, the 47th anniversary of the death of Pope Pius.

Clemens August Graf von Galen ancestors

8. Graf Clemens August von Galen; (1748–1820)
4. Graf Johann Matthias von Galen; (1800–1880)
9. Anna Angela Caroline von Ascheberg; (1773–1806)
2. Graf Ferdinand Heribert von Galen; (1831–1906)
10. Freiherr Maximilian von Ketteler; (1779–1832)
5. Freiin Anna Maria von Ketteler; (1803–1884)
11. Clementine von der Wenge zu Beck; (1778–1844)
1. Kardinal Graf Clemens August von Galen, Bischof von Münster; (1878–1946)
12. Graf Franz von Spee; (1781–1859)
6. Graf August von Spee; (1813–1882)
13. Gräfin Sophie Maria von Merveldt; (1786–1848)
3. Gräfin Elisabeth von Spee; (1842–1920)
14. Graf Friedrich August von Brühl; (1791–1856)
7. Gräfin Franziska von Brühl; (1818–1844)
15. Gräfin Auguste von Sternberg-Manderscheid; (1793–1820)

Clemens August Graf von Galen Galen family Born: 16 March 1878 in Dinklage Died: 22 March 1946 in Münster in Westphalia
Catholic Church titles
Preceded by Johannes Poggenburg	Bishop of Münster; 1933–1946	Succeeded by Michael Keller
