= Kurt von Gehlen =

German mineralogist and professor (1927–1995)

Kurt von Gehlen (9 February 1927 in Kiel/Germany – 17 May 1995 in Königstein im Taunus) was a German mineralogist and professor.

== Family ==
Kurt von Gehlen was married to Gabriele von Roeder; they had three sons, Hans, Wolfgang and Ulrich. His brother is Hans Günter von Gehlen, Professor for Physics.

== Career ==
Kurt von Gehlen got his first experience with science as a young drafted anti-aircraft gunner defending Kiel in the later stages of the war, where he was fascinated by the mechanical computers used to trace the path of enemy bombers. Following that, he attended his first professional lectures in a prisoner of war camp and later attended the Munich, Goettingen, and Freiburg universities. His graduate studies were supervised by Hans Schneiderhöhn, who introduced ore microscopy into earth science during his World War I isolation in southwestern Africa, now Namibia. Kurt von Gehlen investigated the structural relations of galena- and sphalerite-containing fluorite veins in the southwestern Black Forest on which his thesis was based. The pre-electron microprobe identification of ore minerals was an art and von Gehlen became accepted as a junior artist by masters such as Ramdohr and Schneiderhöhn. His respective studies centered on a characterization of copper, iron, and chromium minerals.

From 1953 to 1966 he continued his career at the university of Erlangen-Nuernberg as a research assistant and assistant professor. Now living close to the Bavarian part of the Bohemian Mountains, von Gehlen had to split his geologic interest between the Black Forest and Upper Palatinate, both of which are windows into the Moldanubian belt of the Variscan orogeny. Not satisfied with descriptive mineralogy, he became interested in ore fabrics.

Von Gehlen received the Goldschmidt-Prize of the German Mineralogical Society in 1960 for developing X-ray methods to study ore fabrics. In 1962-1963 he investigated with Gunnar Kullerud at the Geophysical Laboratory of Washington the solubility of Cu in the pyrrhotite structure and reported about the low-temperature properties of this mineral. In the pioneer period of stable isotope geochemistry, he studied the sulfur isotope fractionation in ore deposits of the Black Forest, Silesia, the Rhine valley (Wiesloch), Pallabora (South Africa), and the Gamsberg area of Namibia for conclusions on the conditions of ore deposition.

He was lucky in that he belonged to a postwar academic generation that produced only few people of his kind, that were at the height of their qualification levels during a time when new departments were opened everywhere during the science-wave of the 1960s. As a consequence, he was appointed by the University of Frankfurt as full professor of the new Institute of Petrology, Geochemistry and the study of Ore Deposits in 1966, situated in a (today fortunately) preserved 1902 historic stately home at Senckenberganlage 28. The shortage of suitable candidates had resulted in him receiving a simultaneous call from the Technical University of Hannover. His department soon filled itself with a large number of graduate students but almost no undergraduates. This meant that post-graduates and even academic staff were required to attend his obligatory undergraduate lectures to exceed a quorum. Von Gehlen was an excellent administrator at office level and could beat most office ladies in typing speed. There was nobody like him to develop connections for raising funds to finance graduate studies. This efficiency did not go unnoticed by the faculty, who kept on loading non-scientific administrative work on him. His effectiveness covered a state of inactivity on behalf of his tenured senior staff assistants, which he had selected on the basis of personal friendship rather than scientific potential, a permissible and not uncommon practice at the time. This prevented him from participating in new research to any degree in person which could be considered comparable to that of his earlier years at Erlangen.

In 1970 he published with Schiller and Nielsen early results on sulfur isotope fractionation in experimentally coprecipitated galena and sphalerite. Von Gehlen was highly engaged in the organization of numerous national earth science projects and acted as an editor of several of the respective reports for more than 20 years. These research programs covered subjects as mineral raw materials, the Afar Depression of Ethiopia, stratified sulfide deposits, the Rhenish Massif, and the continental deep drilling in Bavaria.

In 1980 he served as consultant for the United Nations State of Environment Report in the section Mineral Resources. Many people understand the sense of sharing and responsibility needed to make wise but often unpopular decisions, which keep research open for innovations and progress with a minimum level of bureaucracy. Von Gehlen provided his experiences in a remarkable selflessness and courtesy. He never used his position in a committee to demonstrate influence and even accepted stressing obligations when he already suffered from the heart disease. It is important to remember such qualities.

From 1984 to 1986 Kurt von Gehlen acted as president of the German Mineralogical Society. In this position he addressed the participants of the 1986 annual meeting at Mainz with a status report about the genesis of Pb-Zn-F-Ba mineralizations in southwestern Germany, a return to the objects of his early research. In 1993 he formally retired from his professorship at Frankfurt.

Von Gehlen was a very likable person. Polite and unassuming, while highly knowledgeable. An excellent organizer from his desk with typewriter and telephone, if no man to address great audiences. His administrative workload and stress of additionally managing a department in the centre of the highly political atmosphere at Frankfurt University during the late 60s did not improve the frail condition of his health. In fact, the Adorno-Habermas Institute of Sociology as the centre of it all was in the building next door. While Rhyolytic Vulcanism did not belong to his portfolio, he could at times explode in a similar, unpredictive manner. The so-chastized would quickly forgive him and be more worried about the effects on the condition of his heart, which ultimately led to his death at the age of 68. Too early for all who knew him, if later than they had feared on many occasions before. He is greatly missed by all.

== Works ==
- 1955 (with Sehlke, K. and Wecht, P.) Gesteine und Blei-Zink-führende Flusspatgaenge zwischen Feldberg und Belchen im Hochschwarzwald. Teil I. Petrographie. Neues Jb. Miner. Abh. 88, 1–14
- 1955 Gesteine und Blei-Zink-führende Flusspatgaenge zwischen Feldberg und Belchen im Hochschwarzwald. Teil II: Die Flusspatgaenge von Wieden und ihre tektonische Stellung. (mit einem gefuegekundlichen Anhang von O. Braitsch). Neues Jb. Miner. Abh. 88, 15–54
- 1956 (with Hermann Harder): Zur Genese der kretazischen Eisenerze von Auerbach (0berpfalz), Heidelberger Beiträge zur Mineralogie und Petrographie, Bd. 5,Contributions to Mineralogy and Petrology 5, 118–138, PDF
- 1957 Eine Gefuegeanalyse von Magnetkies (Pyrrhotin, FeS). Naturwiss. 44, 394–395
- 1960 Die roentgenographische und optische Gefuegeanalyse von Erzen, insbesondere mit dem Zaehlrohr-Texturgoniometer. (Habil.-Schrift Univ. Erlangen). Beitr. Miner. Petrogr. 7, 340–388.
- 1960 Beispiele von Gefuegeregelungen optisch isotroper und anisotroper Erzminerale und Methoden zu ihrer Untersuchung. Fortschr. Miner. 38, 149–150.
- 1962 (with Nielsen, H. and Ricke, W.) S-Isotopen-Verhaeltnisse in Baryt und Sulfiden aus hydrothermalen Gaengen im Schwarzwald und juengeren Barytgaengen in Sueddeutschland und ihre genetische Bedeutung. Geochim. Cosmochim. Acta 26, 1189–1207.
- 1965 (with Piller, H.) Optics of hexagonal pyrrhotite (Fe9S10). Mineralogical Magazine 35, 335–346
- 1966 Schwefel-Isotope und die Genese von Erzlagerstätten Geologische Rundschau, Volume 55, Issue 1, pp 178–197
- 1969 (with Nielsen, H.) Schwefel-Isotope aus Blei-Zink-Erzen aus Oberschlesien. Mineralium Deposita 4, 308–310
- 1970 (with Schiller, W.-R. and Nielsen, H.) Hydrothermal exchange and fractionation of sulfur isotopes in synthesized ZnS and PbS. Econ. Geol. 65, 350–352
- 1982 Examples of Variscan and Tertiary Pb-Zn mineralizations close to the Rhinegraben. Bull. B.R.G.M. (2), Sect. II. 2. 39–31
- 1985 (with Nielsen, H.) Sulfur isotopes and the formation of stratabound leadbearing Triassic sandstones in northeastern Bavaria. Geol. Jb. D 70, 213–223.
- 1987 Formation of Pb-Zn-F-Ba mineralizations in SW Germany: a status report. Fortschr. Miner. 65, 87–114.
- 1992 (with Hallbauer, D.) Zur Frage der Herkunft des WitwatersrandGoldes: silberreiches Gold in archaischen Quarzschiefern vom Vredefort-Dom, Südafrika. In Jacob, K.-H., Ed., Festschrift 80. Geb. Albrecht Wilke, 7 p.

== Sources ==
- Mineralogical Society of America: Memorial of Kurt von Gehlen
