= Galien =

Galien may refer to the following:

== Places in the United States ==
- Galien Township, Michigan, Berrien County
  - Galien, Michigan, a village in the township
- Galien River, in southwest Michigan

== Other uses ==
- Galiens li Restorés, a chanson de geste about a hero named Galien
- Joseph Galien (1699-1762), French theologian and academic

== See also ==
- Gallienus (218-268), Roman emperor
- René de Bréhant de Galinée (1645–1678), North American explorer
- Galen (disambiguation)
- Galan (disambiguation)
