= Robert S. Galen =

Physician

Robert S. Galen (born May 29, 1946) is a physician, Professor Emeritus of Epidemiology and former Senior Associate Dean in the College of Public Health at The University of Georgia. Galen is also the former Chair of the Division of Public Health at UGA's Biomedical Health Science Institute and founder of the Global Health Program there.

Galen matriculated in the 6-year medical program at Boston University School of Medicine, graduating in 1970. While in medical school Galen held an externship at Manned Spacecraft in Houston, Texas during the July 1969 Apollo 11 Moon landing. He is best known as co-author of the medical text Beyond Normality: The Predictive Value and Efficiency of Medical Diagnosis (1975).

Galen holds many patents, including US 5695949: The Combined Assay for Current Glucose Level and Intermediate or Long-Term Glycemic Control.
