= Gaylon H. White =

American sportswriter

Gaylon Hooper White, is an American sportswriter and author of six books.

== Early life ==
White graduated in 1967 from the University of Oklahoma with a bachelor's degree in journalism-broadcasting. He was a sportswriter for the Denver Post, Arizona Republic and Oklahoma Journal before entering the corporate world and writing speeches for top executives at The Goodyear Tire & Rubber Company, Control Data Corporation and Eastman Chemical Company.

At Eastman, a manufacturer of plastics, chemicals and fibers, he established an award-winning website, the Eastman Innovation Lab, which used storytelling to bridge the communications gap between the materials and design worlds.

White received a personal recognition award from the Industrial Designers Society of America (IDSA) in 2010 for his support of design education and being a “great builder of bridges” between the manufacturing and design communities. In 2011, White was awarded an honorary lifetime membership in the Industrial Designers Society of America (IDSA). “At heart, Gaylon White is a storyteller,” Bob Grace of Plastics News wrote on White's retirement from Eastman in 2012. “Others would do well to learn from his story.”

In 2015 the Industrial Designers Society of America (IDSA) selected him as one of its 50 most notable members from the past 50 years.

White is a member of the Industrial Designers Society of America and Society for American Baseball Research. He lives in Kingsport, Tennessee.

== Sportswriting career ==
Coach of a Lifetime is the story of a high school football coach who motivates and encourages kids to do extraordinary things on and off the field. Coach Nick Saban wrote the foreword to the book.

The Best Little Baseball Town in the World is the story of Crowley, Louisiana, in the 1950s. The book has it all — tragedy and triumph; mystery and mayhem; good and bad guys; the renowned and the unknown; even a famous biscuit recipe.

Left On Base in the Bush Leagues profiles some of the most colorful characters from baseball's golden era. It includes the stories of players such as Ron Necciai, the only pitcher in history to strike out 27 batters in a nine-inning game; Joe Brovia, a hitter who cursed pitchers, and then, hit the cover off the ball; Bob Dillinger, a perennial .300 hitter in the majors, who was exiled to the minors because he didn't give team management the respect they wanted.

Jim McConnell, former sports columnist and author, writes: "Meticulously researched and compellingly presented, Left On Base in the Bush Leagues is the best book on 1950's minor league baseball ever, a milestone worthy of sharing the same bookshelf with "The Glory of their Times."

Hailed as “one of the best sports books of 2014” by Bruce Miles of the Chicago Daily Herald, The Bilko Athletic Club is about beer-loving, home run-hitting Steve Bilko and the 1956 Los Angeles Angels of the old Pacific Coast League.

Accidental Big Leaguer covers the career of Jackson, a two-time National League All-Star in the 1950s and the last Brooklyn Dodger to hit a home run. The book was a grand slam with Allen Barra of the Chicago Tribune, who wrote: “We can only hope that among today’s players there’s someone as sharp and funny as Handsome Ransom Jackson to remember them.”

Singles and Smiles traces Artie Wilson's life from Birmingham, Alabama, where he was born in 1920 to Portland, Oregon, where he lived 55 years until his death in 2010 at the age of 90.

Artie Wilson was 30 years old when he quickly passed through the majors with the New York Giants. He started just one game, batting a mere 24 times. He slapped four singles, walked twice, swiped two bases, scored two runs and batted in another to hit .182. Despite his brief stay in the majors, Artie knew from five all-star seasons with the Birmingham Black Barons (1944–48) in the Negro American League that he could play with the best. He batted .402 for the Black Barons in 1948, the last player to top the .400 mark at the major league level.

== Written works ==
- The Bilko Athletic Club: The Story of the 1956 Los Angeles Angels (2014)
- Handsome Ransom Jackson: Accidental Big Leaguer (2016)
- Singles and Smiles: How Artie Wilson Broke Baseball’s Color Barrier (2018)
- Left On Base in the Bush Leagues: Legends, Near Greats and Unknowns in the Minors (2019)
- The Best Little Baseball Town in the World: The Crowley Millers and Minor League Baseball in the 1950s (2021)
- Coach of a Lifetime: The Story of Lewis Cook Jr., Legendary High School Football Coach (2023)

== Awards ==
- Technology from the heart, 2011 Industrial Design Excellence Awards, Curator's Choice
- Making the world safer through design, 2010 Industrial Design Excel Award

== Articles ==
- "PN launches series by Gaylon White". Plastics News. August 19, 2013.
- "IDSA honors Gaylon White". Plastics News. September 27, 2011.
- "Eastman soups up design-centric website". Plastics News. September 26, 2011.
- "White leaving legacy of design innovation". Plastics News. September 26, 2011.
- "Clean water technology travels the globe, packaged in plastic". Plastics News. May 9, 2011.
- "Decade-old flood wall gaining acceptance". Plastics News. September 13, 2010.
- "Eastman cultivates a niche for working with designers". Plastics News. May 24, 2010.
