= Galán, Santander =

Coordinates: 6°42′N 73°18′W

Galán
- Municipality and town
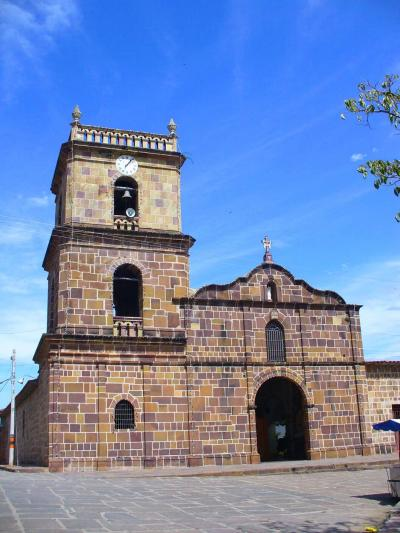

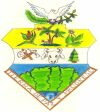
- Flag Coat of arms

- Location of the municipality and town of Galán in the Santander Department of Colombia.
- Country: Colombia
- Department: Santander Department
- Time zone: UTC-5 (Colombia Standard Time)

Galán is a town and municipality in the Santander Department in northeastern Colombia.
