= Gaylon =

Gaylon is a given name, generally but not exclusively male, which may refer to:

- Gaylon Alcaraz (born 1966), American community organizer and human rights activist
- Gaylon Lawrence (1934–2012), American businessman and farmer
- Gaylon Moore (born 1978), American former basketball player
- Gaylon Nickerson (born 1969), American former basketball player
- Gaylon Smith (1916–1958), American National Football League player
- Gaylon H. White, American sportswriter

== See also ==
- Galen (disambiguation)
