= Nos galan =

Nos galan may refer to:

- "Nos Galan", a Welsh winter carol; see "Deck the Halls"
- Nos Galan road race, in memorial of Guto Nyth Brân
