= Kileh Golan =

Kileh Golan كيله گلان
- Village
- Location within Iran
- Coordinates: 35°03′28″N 47°13′21″E
- Country: Iran
- Province: Kurdistan
- County: Kamyaran
- Bakhsh: Muchesh
- Rural District: Amirabad

Population (2006)
  - Total: 403
- Time zone: UTC+3:30 (IRST)
  - Summer (DST): UTC+4:30 (IRDT)

Kileh Golan (Persian: كيله گلان, also Romanized as Kīleh Golān and Keyleh Golān; also known as Kelīleh Galān, Kīlūlān, and Qīlavān) is a village in Amirabad Rural District, Muchesh District, Kamyaran County, Kurdistan Province, Iran. At the 2006 census, its population was 403, in 92 families. The village is populated by Kurds.
