= Larson Gallery =

Coordinates: 46°35′04″N 120°31′50″W

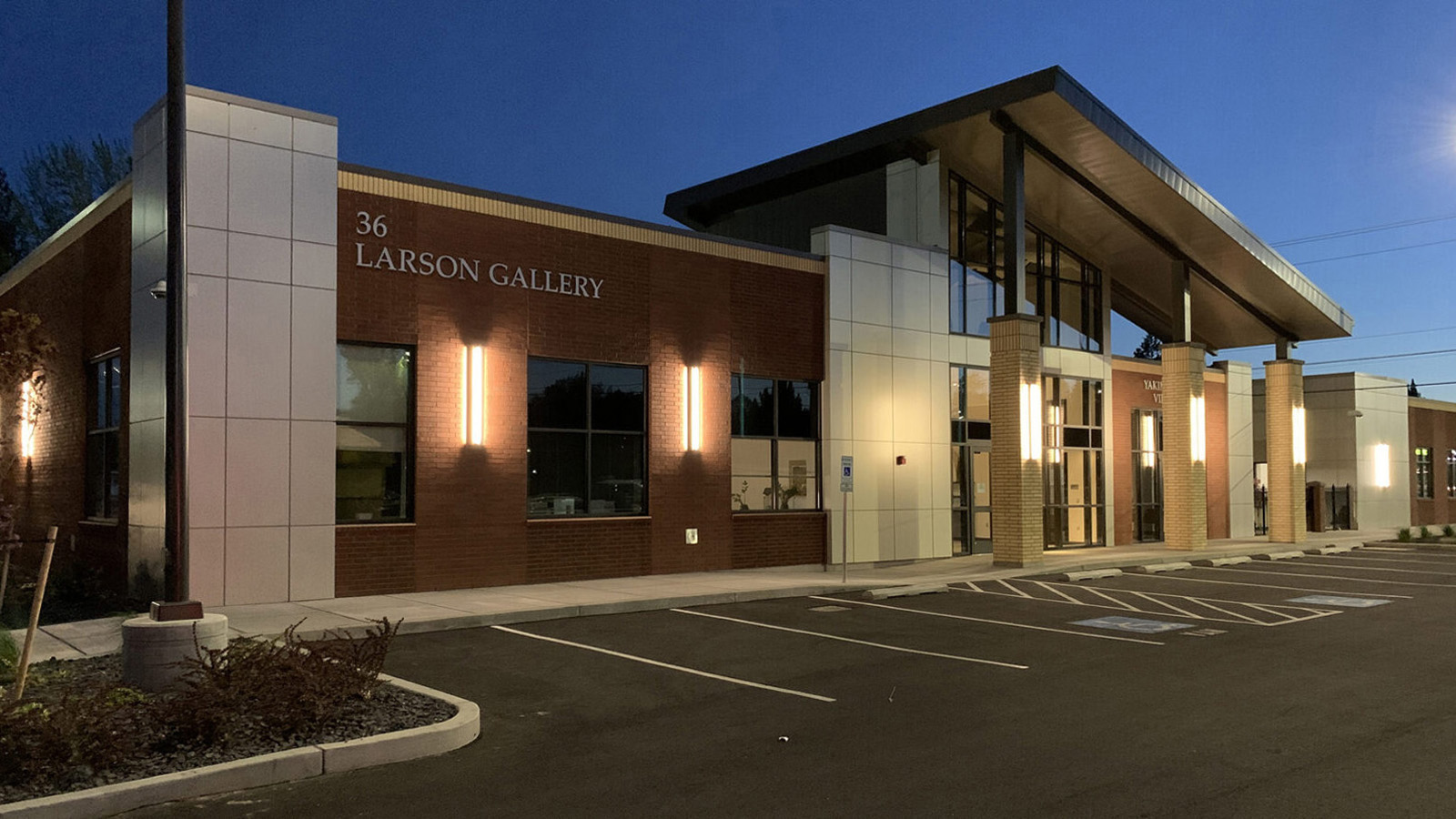
Larson Gallery

The Larson Gallery is located in Yakima, Washington in Yakima Valley College. Founded in 1949, the Gallery exhibits art from local, regional, and national artists in curated solo and small group exhibitions, as well as large juried competitions.

Larson Gallery is free to students and the public. Exhibits change seven times a year. Educational opportunities include the summer workshop series, artist lectures, and tours.

The Larson Gallery Guild, a 501(c)(3) non-profit organization, works in partnership with the Larson Gallery and Yakima Valley College to provide a cultural resource that benefits the entire Central Washington region.
