= Galen Framework =

- Original author: Ivan Shubin
- Initial release: 2013
- Stable release: 2.4.4 / March 15, 2019; 6 years ago
- Repository: github.com/galenframework/galen
- Written in: Java
- Operating system: Cross-platform
- Available in: English
- Type: Test automation
- License: Apache License v2.0
- Website: galenframework.com

Galen Framework is an open source layout and functional testing framework for websites, written in Java, which allows testing the look and feel of responsive websites. It has its own special language Galen Specs for describing the positioning and alignment of elements on a Web page. It is based on Selenium and could be executed via Selenium Grid for cross-browser testing

== Main features ==
- Testing location of elements on page
- Image comparison for selected area
- Functional testing
- Applying TDD approach in Web development

== Galen Specs Language ==
Galen Specs language consists of the following entities:

- Page object locator definitions
- Tagged sections
- Test objects
- Test specs

# Declaring objects
@objects
    header              id header
        icon            css img.icon
        text            xpath //h1

# Declaring a section
= Header = 
    @on *
        header:
            inside screen 0px top left right
            height ~ 70px

        header.icon:
            width 34px
            height 34px
            centered vertically inside header
            inside header 7 to 10px left

    @on desktop
        header.text:
            centered vertically inside header
            right of header.icon 5 to 15px

    @on mobile
        header.text:
            absent
