= Galen family =

German noble family

von Galen
- noble family
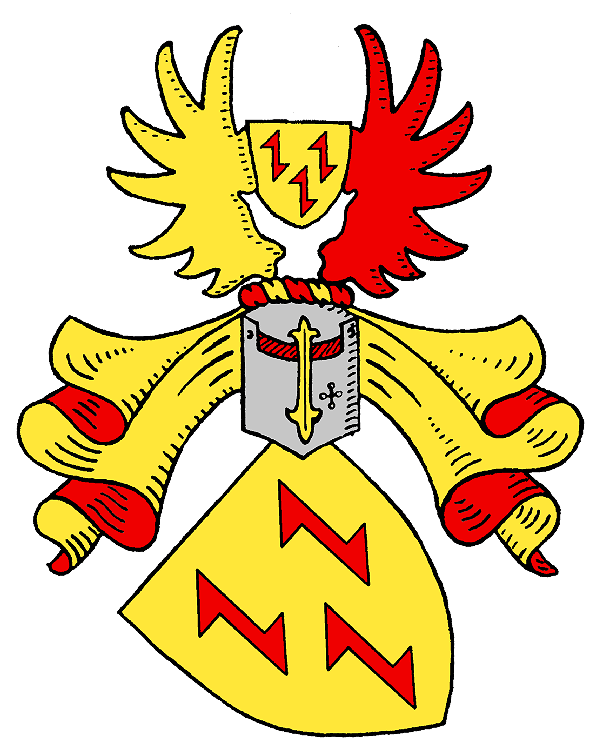
- Coat of arms of the Galen family
- Country: Germany
- Founded: 13th century
- Founder: Rotger von Galen
- Titles: Freiherr, count

The House of Galen is an ancient and influential German noble, Westphalian family, historically Roman Catholic, originated from the County of Mark.

== History ==
The earliest written document of the Galen family dates back to the 12th century. Some branches of the family spread to East Prussia through the crusades and military expeditions of the Teutonic Order during the high and late Middle Ages. The German branches still in existence hold the titles of Freiherr (baron) and Graf (count), granted to them on 10 July 1803 by Frederick William III of Prussia.

== Famous Members ==
- Christoph Bernhard von Galen, prince-bishop of Münster during the Counter-Reformation.
- Clemens August Graf von Galen, better known as Clemens August Graf von Galen, German count, Bishop of Münster, and Cardinal.
- Johanna von Galen, German politician.
