= Galen Institute =

Non-profit public policy research organization

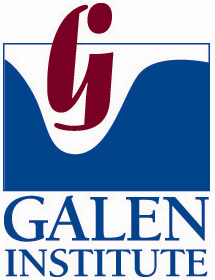
- Formation: 1995; 31 years ago
- Type: Public policy think tank
- Location: Paeonian Springs, Virginia
- Fields: Health care
- Revenue: $114,244 (2022)
- Expenses: $481,565 (2022)
- Website: www.galen.org

The Galen Institute is an American non-profit research organization that focuses on market-based policy solutions in health care. According to its mission statement, it works to promote "public debate and education about proposals that support individual freedom, consumer choice, competition, and innovation in the health sector." The institute was founded in 1995 by Grace-Marie Turner (née Arnett) in the aftermath of the national debate in 1993–94 over health policy legislation proposed by then President Bill Clinton.

== History ==
The Galen Institute created the Health Policy Consensus Group in 1993 to convene market-based policy experts to develop health policy reform proposals. The Consensus Group's first statement, “A Vision for Consumer-Directed Health Reform," was released in 1994 and led to a conference in the Hart Senate Office Building in 1996, “A Fresh Approach to Health Care Reform,” featuring 14 Consensus Group participants. The presentations were later published in a peer-reviewed book, “Empowering Health Care Consumers through Tax Reform” (University of Michigan Press, 1999).

The Galen Institute has been engaged in major health policy debates since its inception, including re-authorization of the State Children's Health Insurance Program, creation of a prescription drug benefit for Medicare, and educating the debate about the Affordable Care Act (ACA). Several Consensus Group participants co-authored a book about the ACA, “Why ObamaCare Is Wrong for America” (HarperCollins, 2011). The Galen Institute also filed amicus briefs in U.S. Supreme Court challenging to the health care law.

The institute also has led in producing the Health Care Choices 20/20 proposal which 82 organizations have signed to offer a health reform alternative that devolves decisions through states to doctors and patients. An independent analysis shows the plan would reduce the costs of premiums in the individual market, result in 4 million more people purchasing health coverage, and decrease federal spending by $36 billion from 2022 to 2030.

== Activities ==
Institute scholars are regularly invited to testify before Congress, including several testimonies by Galen Institute President Turner in 2019 against Medicare for All before the House Committee on Rules, the House Committee on Energy and Commerce, the House Committee on Ways and Means, and House Committee on Education and Labor. The Institute publishes a weekly newsletter, AmericanHealthCareChoices, distributed to thousands of leaders in the health sector and published on the Institute's website.

The organization's scholars write major papers, op-eds and commentaries, and are quoted regularly in major media outlets. In 2020, the University of Pennsylvania’s 2019 Global Go To Think Tank Report ranked the Galen Institute as the 4th Free Market Domestic Health Affairs Think Tank in the U.S. That same year, Business Insider named Galen scholars as three of the 24 most powerful people advising Washington officials on healthcare.

== Funding ==
The Galen Institute is a 501(c)(3) organization funded by donations from individuals, foundations, and corporations. It neither seeks nor receives government funding.
