= Christian denomination =

Identifiable Christian body with common characteristics

A Christian denomination is a distinct religious group within Christianity that comprises all church congregations of the same kind, identifiable by traits such as a name, particular history, organization, leadership, theological doctrine, worship style and, sometimes, a founder. It is a secular, neutral term generally used to denote any established Christian church. Unlike a cult or sect, a denomination is usually seen as part of the Christian religious mainstream. Most Christian denominations refer to themselves as churches, whereas some newer ones tend to interchangeably use the terms churches, assemblies, fellowships, etc. Divisions between one group and another are defined by authority and doctrine; issues such as the nature of Jesus, the authority of apostolic succession, biblical hermeneutics, theology, ecclesiology, eschatology, and papal primacy may separate one denomination from another.

Groups of denominations—often sharing broadly similar beliefs, practices, and historical ties—are sometimes known as "branches of Christianity". These branches differ in many ways, especially in their practices and beliefs.

Individual denominations vary widely in the degree to which they recognize one another. Several groups claim to be the direct and sole authentic successor of the church founded by Jesus Christ in the 1st century AD. Others, however, believe in denominationalism, where some or all Christian groups are legitimate churches of the same religion regardless of their distinguishing labels, beliefs, and practices. Because of this concept, some Christian bodies reject the term "denomination" to describe themselves, to avoid implying equivalence with other churches or denominations.

The Catholic Church, which has over 1.3 billion members or 50.1% of all Christians worldwide, does not view itself as a denomination, but as the original pre-denominational Church. The total Protestant population has reached around 1.047 billion in 2024, accounting for about 39.8% of all Christians. Sixteenth-century Protestants separated from the Catholic Church as a result of the Reformation, a movement against doctrines and practices which the Reformers perceived to be in violation of the Bible. Together, Catholicism and Protestantism (with major traditions including Adventism, Anabaptism, Anglicanism, Baptists, Lutheranism, Methodism, Moravianism, Pentecostalism, Plymouth Brethren, Quakerism, Reformed, and Waldensianism) compose Western Christianity. Western Christian denominations prevail in Sub-Saharan Africa, Western Europe, North America, Oceania and South America.

The Eastern Orthodox Church, with an estimated 220 million adherents, is the second-largest Christian body in the world and also considers itself the original pre-denominational Church. Orthodox Christians, 80% of whom are Eastern Orthodox and 20% Oriental Orthodox, make up about 11.9% of the global Christian population. The Eastern Orthodox Church is itself a communion of fully independent autocephalous churches (or "jurisdictions") that recognize each other, for the most part. Similarly, the Catholic Church is a communion of sui iuris churches, including 23 Eastern churches. The Eastern Orthodox Church, the 23 Eastern Catholic Churches, the Oriental Orthodox communion, the Assyrian Church of the East, the Ancient Church of the East, and the Eastern Lutheran Churches constitute Eastern Christianity. There are certain Eastern Protestant Christians who have adopted Protestant theology but have cultural and historical ties with other Eastern Christians. Eastern Christian denominations are represented mostly in Eastern Europe, North Asia, the Middle East, Northeast Africa, and India.

Christians hold various doctrines about the Church (the body of the faithful that they believe Jesus Christ established) and about how the divine Church relates to Christian denominations. The Catholic, Eastern Orthodox, Oriental Orthodox, Church of the East, and Lutheran denominations each hold that only their own specific organization faithfully represents the one holy catholic and apostolic Church, to the exclusion of all others. Certain denominational traditions teach that they were divinely instituted to propagate a certain doctrine or spiritual experience, for example, the raising up of Methodism by God to propagate entire sanctification (the "second blessing"), or the launch of Pentecostalism to bestow a supernatural empowerment evidenced by speaking in tongues on humanity.

Restorationism emerged after the Second Great Awakening and collectively affirms belief in a Great Apostasy, thus promoting a belief in restoring what they see as primitive Christianity. It includes Latter-day Saints, Irvingians, Christadelphians, Swedenborgians, Jehovah's Witnesses, among others, although beliefs between these religions differ greatly.

Generally, members of the various denominations acknowledge each other as Christians, at least to the extent that they have mutually recognized baptisms and acknowledge historically orthodox views including the divinity of Jesus and doctrines of sin and salvation, even though doctrinal and ecclesiological obstacles hinder full communion between churches. Since the reforms surrounding the Second Vatican Council of 1962–1965, the Catholic Church has referred to Protestant churches as ecclesial communities, while reserving the term "church" for apostolic churches, including the Eastern and Oriental Orthodox Churches, as well as the Ancient and Assyrian Churches of the East. But some non-denominational Christians do not follow any particular branch, though they sometimes are regarded as Protestants.

== Terminology ==
A denomination within Christianity can be defined as a "recognized autonomous branch of the Christian Church"; major synonyms include "religious group, sect, Church," etc. (Note: The Oxford Dictionary's full list of synonyms for "denomination" includes: "religious group, sect, Church, cult, movement, faith community, body, persuasion, religious persuasion, communion, order, fraternity, brotherhood, sisterhood, school; faith, creed, belief, religious belief, religion. rare: sodality.") "Church" as a synonym, refers to a "particular Christian organization with its own clergy, buildings, and distinctive doctrines"; "church" can also more broadly be defined as the entire body of Christians, the "Christian Church".

Some traditional and evangelical Protestants draw a distinction between membership in the universal church and fellowship within the local church. Becoming a believer in Christ makes one a member of the universal church; one then may join a fellowship of other local believers. Some evangelical groups describe themselves as interdenominational fellowships, partnering with local churches to strengthen evangelical efforts, usually targeting a particular group with specialized needs, such as students or ethnic groups. A related concept is denominationalism, the belief that some or all Christian groups are legitimate churches of the same religion regardless of their distinguishing labels, beliefs, and practices. (Conversely, "denominationalism" can also refer to "emphasizing of denominational differences to the point of being narrowly exclusive", similar to sectarianism.)

The views of Protestant leaders differ greatly from those of the leaders of the Catholic Church and the Eastern Orthodox Church, the two largest single Christian churches. Each church makes mutually exclusive claims to be the direct continuation of the church founded by Jesus Christ, from whom other denominations later broke away. These churches, and a few others, reject denominationalism. For the academic study of religion, the main families of Christianity are categorized as denominations, that is, "an organized body of Christians."

Historically, Catholics would label members of certain Christian churches (also certain non-Christian religions) by the names of their founders, either actual or purported. Such supposed founders were referred to as heresiarchs. This was done even when the party thus labeled viewed itself as belonging to the one true church. This allowed the Catholic party to claim that the other church was founded by its founder, whereas the Catholic church was founded by Christ. This was done intentionally in order to "produce the appearance of the fragmentation within Christianity" – a problem which the Catholic side would then attempt to remedy on its own terms.

Although Catholics reject branch theory, Pope Benedict XVI and Pope John Paul II used the "two lungs" concept to relate Catholicism with Eastern Orthodoxy.

== Major branches ==
World Christianity by tradition in 2024 as per World Christian Database
1. Catholic (48.6%)
2. Protestant (39.8%)
3. Orthodox, including Eastern and Oriental communions (11.1%)
4. Other (0.50%)
Worldwide Christians by denomination as of 2011
1. Catholic (50.1%)
2. Protestant (36.7%)
3. Orthodox, including Eastern and Oriental communions (11.9%)
4. Other (1.30%)

Christianity can be taxonomically divided into six main groups: the Church of the East, Oriental Orthodoxy, Eastern Orthodoxy, Catholicism, Protestantism, and Restorationism. Protestantism includes many groups that do not share any ecclesiastical governance and have widely diverging beliefs and practices. Major Protestant branches include Adventism, Anabaptism, Anglicanism, Baptists, Lutheranism, Methodism, Moravianism, Quakerism, Pentecostalism, Plymouth Brethren, Reformed Christianity, and Waldensianism. Reformed Christianity itself includes the Continental Reformed, Presbyterian, Evangelical Anglican, Congregationalist, and Reformed Baptist traditions. Anabaptist Christianity itself includes the Amish, Apostolic, Bruderhof, Hutterite, Mennonite, River Brethren, and Schwarzenau Brethren traditions.

Within the Restorationist branch of Christianity, denominations include the Irvingians, Swedenborgians, Christadelphians, Latter Day Saints, Jehovah's Witnesses, La Luz del Mundo, and Iglesia ni Cristo.

Christianity has denominational families (or movements) and also has individual denominations (or communions). The difference between a denomination and a denominational family is sometimes unclear to outsiders. Some denominational families can be considered major branches. Groups that are members of a branch, while sharing historical ties and similar doctrines, are not necessarily in communion with one another.

There were some movements considered heresies by the early Church which do not exist today and are not generally referred to as denominations: examples include the Gnostics (who had believed in an esoteric dualism called gnosis), the Ebionites (who denied the divinity of Jesus), and the Arians (who subordinated the Son to the Father by denying the pre-existence of Christ, thus placing Jesus as a created being), Bogomilism and the Bosnian Church. The greatest divisions in Christianity today, however, are between the Eastern and Oriental Orthodox, Catholics, and the various denominations formed during and after the Protestant Reformation. There also exists a number of non-Trinitarian groups.

=== Denominationalism ===
Denominationalism is the belief that some or all Christian groups are legitimate churches of the same religion regardless of their distinguishing labels, beliefs, and practices. The idea was first articulated by Independents within the Puritan movement. They argued that differences among Christians were inevitable, but that separation based on these differences was not necessarily schism. Christians are obligated to practice their beliefs rather than remain within a church with which they disagree, but they must also recognize their imperfect knowledge and not condemn other Christians as apostate over unimportant matters.

Some Christians view denominationalism as a regrettable fact. As of 2011, divisions are becoming less sharp, and there is increasing cooperation among denominations, known as ecumenism. Many denominations participate in the World Council of Churches.

=== Taxonomy ===

(Not shown are ante-Nicene, nontrinitarian, and restorationist denominations.)

== Historical schisms and divisions ==
Christianity has not been a monolithic faith since the first century or Apostolic Age, though Christians were largely in communion with each other. Today there exist a large variety of groups that share a common history and tradition within and without mainstream Christianity. Christianity is the largest religion in the world (making up approximately one-third of the population) and the various divisions have commonalities and differences in tradition, theology, church government, doctrine, and language.

The largest schism in many classification schemes is between the Eastern Christianity and Western Christianity families. After these two larger families come distinct branches of Christianity. Most classification schemes list Catholicism, Protestantism, and Orthodox Christianity, with Orthodox Christianity being divided into Eastern Orthodoxy, Oriental Orthodoxy and the Church of the East. However Catholicism is to be seen as a distinct denomination within Western Christianity. Protestantism includes diverse groups such as Adventists, Anabaptists, Anglicans, Baptists, Congregationalists, Methodists (inclusive of the Holiness movement), Moravians, Pentecostals, Presbyterians, Reformed, and Unitarians (depending on one's classification scheme) are all a part of the same family but have distinct doctrinal variations within each group—Lutherans see themselves not to be a part of the rest of what they call "Reformed Protestantism" due to radical differences in sacramental theology and historical approach to the Reformation itself (both Reformed and Lutherans see their reformation in the sixteenth century to be a 'reforming' of the Catholic Church, not a rejection of it entirely). From these come denominations, which in the West, have independence from the others in their doctrine.

The Catholic Church, due to its hierarchical structures, is not said to be made up of denominations, rather, it is a single denomination that include kinds of regional councils and individual congregations and church bodies, which do not officially differ from one another in doctrine.

=== Antiquity ===
The initial differences between the East and West traditions stem from socio-cultural and ethno-linguistic divisions in and between the Western Roman and Byzantine empires. Since the West (that is, Western Europe) spoke Latin as its lingua franca and the East (Eastern Europe, the Middle East, Asia, and northern Africa) largely used Aramaic and Koine Greek to transmit writings, theological developments were difficult to translate from one branch to the other. In the course of ecumenical councils (large gatherings of Christian leaders), some church bodies split from the larger family of Christianity. Many earlier heretical groups either died off for lack of followers or suppression by the early proto-orthodox Church at large (such as Apollinarians, Montanists, and Ebionites).

The Council of Ephesus in 431 was the first ecumenical council to result in a schism between churches that are both still surviving today, with the Church of the East not accepting the council because of its condemnation of Nestorius for his teachings called Nestorianism. The Council is accepted by Catholic, Eastern Orthodox, Oriental Orthodox, Lutheran, Anglican, and Reformed churches. There are several different definitions of Nestorianism, and it is disputed how accurate these definitions are to the actual teachings of Nestorius, and to the theology of the Church of the East. As a “basic step” towards returning into communion, a common Christological declaration was made between Pope John Paul II of the Catholic Church and Patriarch Dinkha IV of the Assyrian Church of the East.

The Council of Chalcedon in 451 resulted in the next large split, with the Syriac Orthodox and Coptic Orthodox churches dividing from the Chalcedonian Church, with some becoming today's Oriental Orthodox Churches. These churches share a common Christological doctrine of Miaphysitism. The Armenian Apostolic Church, whose representatives were not able to attend the council did not accept new dogmas and now is also seen as an Oriental Orthodox church. In modern times, there have also been moves towards healing this split, with common Christological statements being made between Pope John Paul II and Patriarch Ignatius Zakka I Iwas of the Syriac Orthodox Church, as well as through the Joint Commission between the Eastern Orthodox and Oriental Orthodox Churches.

There has been a statement that the Council of Chalcedon restored Nestorianism. This is largely due to its endorsement of the Tome of Leo, which contains statements that can be interpreted as contradicting the Christology of Cyril of Alexandria endorsed in the previous Council of Ephesus. However, a large number of the bishops that accepted Chalcedon made acclamations that Leo's Tome was faithful to the Christology of Cyril. Nestorius also agreed to the conclusions of the council, leading to some confusion as to correct interpretation of the Chalcedonian Christological Definition.

=== Middle Ages ===
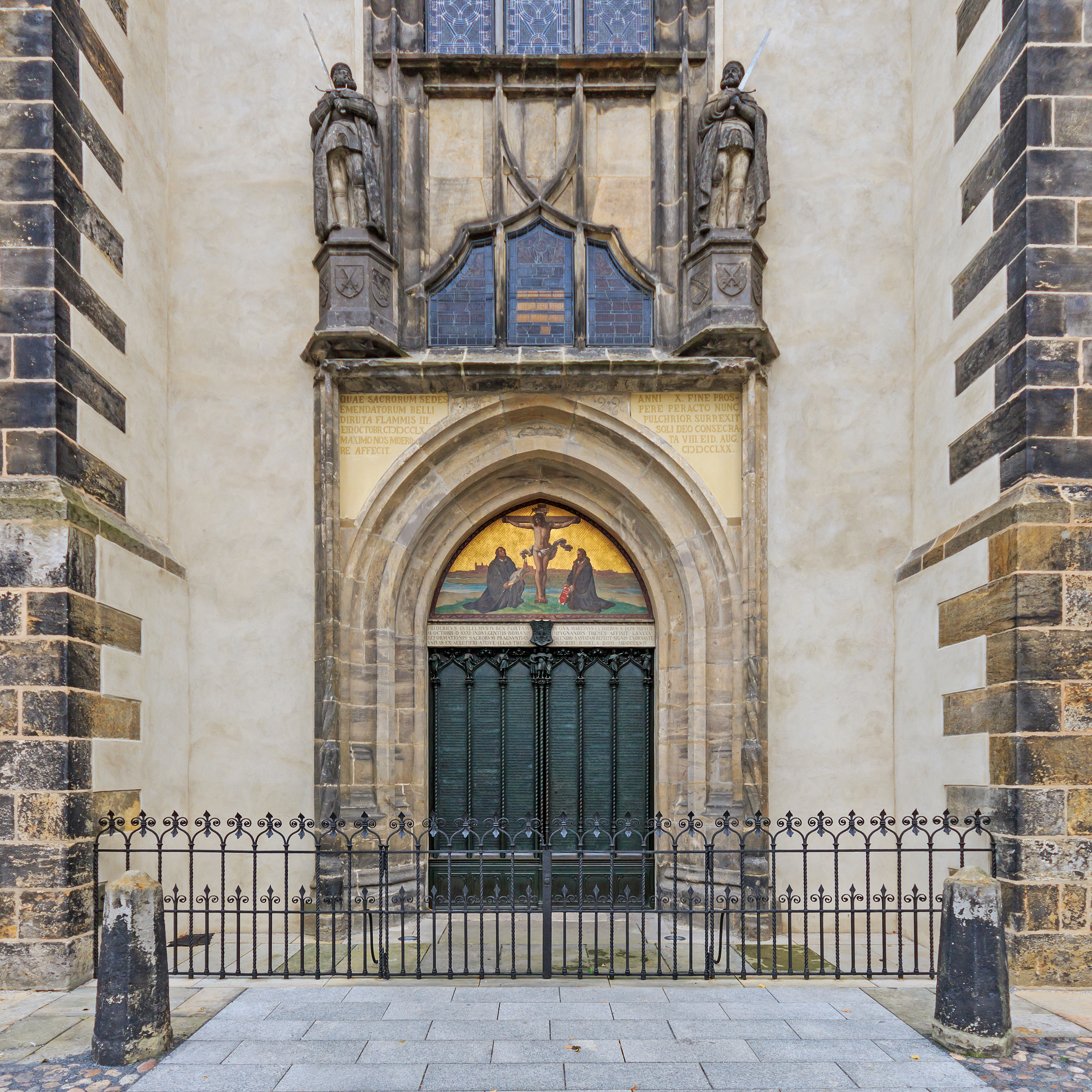
The front door of All Saints' Church in Wittenberg, Germany, where Martin Luther nailed his Ninety-five Theses on 31st October 1517, sparking the Reformation

In Western Christianity, a handful of geographically isolated movements preceded the spirit of the Protestant Reformation. The Cathars were a very strong movement in medieval southwestern France, but did not survive into modern times. In northern Italy and southeastern France, Peter Waldo founded the Waldensians in the 12th century. This movement has largely been absorbed by modern-day Protestant groups. In Bohemia, a movement in the early 15th century by Jan Hus called the Hussites defied Catholic dogma, creating the still-extant Moravian Church, a major Protestant denomination.

Although the church as a whole did not experience any major divisions for centuries afterward, the Eastern and Western groups drifted until the point where patriarchs from both families excommunicated one another in about 1054 in what is known as the Great Schism. The political and theological reasons for the schism are complex, but one major controversy was the inclusion and acceptance in the West of the filioque clause into the Nicene Creed, which the East viewed as erroneous. Another was the definition of papal primacy.

Both West and East agreed that the Patriarch of Rome was owed a "primacy of honour" by the other patriarchs (those of Alexandria, Antioch, Constantinople and Jerusalem), but the West also contended that this primacy extended to jurisdiction, a position rejected by the Eastern patriarchs. Various attempts at dialogue between the two groups would occur, but it was only in the 1960s, under Pope Paul VI and Patriarch Athenagoras, that significant steps began to be made to mend the relationship between the two.

=== Protestant Reformation (16th century) ===
The Protestant Reformation began with the posting of Martin Luther's Ninety-Five Theses in Saxony on October 31, 1517, written as a set of grievances to reform the pre-Reformation Western Church. Luther's writings, combined with the work of Swiss theologian Huldrych Zwingli and French theologian and politician John Calvin sought to reform existing problems in doctrine and practice. Due to the reactions of ecclesiastical office holders at the time of the reformers, these reformers separated from the Catholic Church, instigating a rift in Western Christianity.

In England, Henry VIII of England declared himself to be supreme head of the Church of England with the Act of Supremacy in 1534, founding the Church of England, repressing both Lutheran reformers and those loyal to the pope. Thomas Cranmer as Archbishop of Canterbury introduced the Reformation, in a form compromising between the Calvinists and Lutherans.

=== Old and Liberal Catholic Churches (19th–20th centuries) ===
The Old Catholic Church split from the Catholic Church in the 1870s because of the promulgation of the dogma of papal infallibility as promoted by the First Vatican Council of 1869–1870. The term 'Old Catholic' was first used in 1853 to describe the members of the See of Utrecht that were not under Papal authority. The Old Catholic movement grew in America but has not maintained ties with Utrecht, although talks are under way between independent Old Catholic bishops and Utrecht.

The Liberal Catholic Church started in 1916 via an Old Catholic bishop in London, bishop Matthew, who consecrated bishop James Wedgwood to the Episcopacy. This stream has in its relatively short existence known many splits, which operate worldwide under several names.

=== Eastern Christianity ===
In the Eastern world, the largest body of believers in modern times is the Eastern Orthodox Church, sometimes imprecisely called "Greek Orthodox" because from the time of Christ through the Byzantine empire, Greek was its common language. However, the term "Greek Orthodox" actually refers to only one portion of the entire Eastern Orthodox Church. The Eastern Orthodox Church believes itself to be the continuation of the original Christian Church established by Jesus Christ, and the Apostles. The Orthodox and Catholics have been separated since the 11th century, following the East–West Schism, with each of them saying they represent the original pre-schism Church.

The Eastern Orthodox consider themselves to be spiritually one body, which is administratively grouped into several autocephalous jurisdictions (also commonly referred to as "churches", despite being parts of one Church). They do not recognize any single bishop as universal church leader, but rather each bishop governs only his own diocese. The Patriarch of Constantinople is known as the Ecumenical Patriarch, and holds the title "first among equals", meaning only that if a great council is called, the patriarch sits as president of the council. He has no more power than any other bishop. Currently, the largest synod with the most members is the Russian Orthodox Church. Others include the ancient Patriarchates of Constantinople, Alexandria, Antioch and Jerusalem, the Georgian, Romanian, Serbian and Bulgarian Orthodox churches, and several smaller ones.

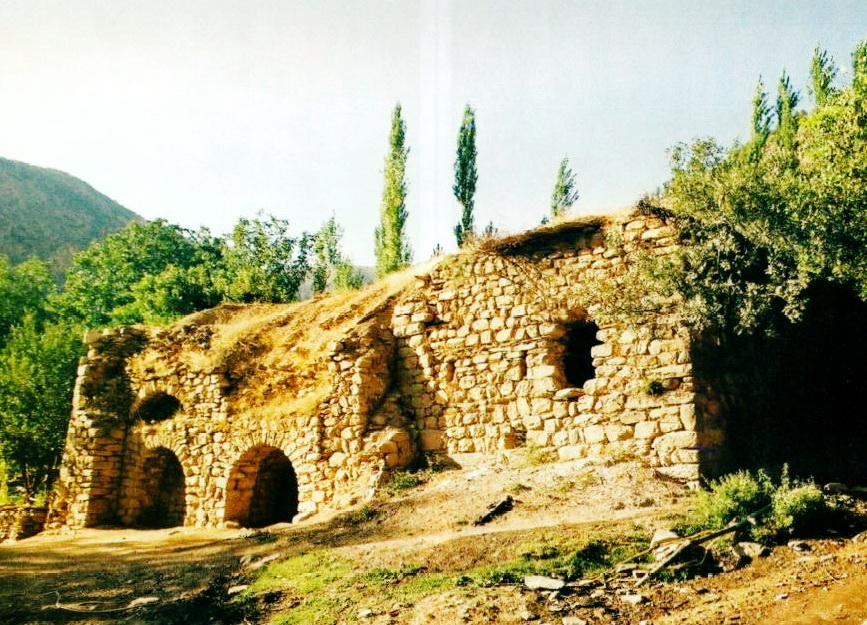
A 6th-century Nestorian church, St. John the Arab, in the Assyrian village of Geramon

The second largest Eastern Christian communion is Oriental Orthodoxy, which is organized in a similar manner, with six national autocephalous groups and two autonomous bodies, although there are greater internal differences than among the Eastern Orthodox (especially in the diversity of rites being used). The six autocephalous Oriental Orthodox churches are the Coptic (Egyptian), Syriac, Armenian, Malankara (Indian), Ethiopian and Eritrean Orthodox churches. In the Aramaic-speaking areas of the Middle East, the Syriac Orthodox Church has long been dominant. Although the region of modern-day Ethiopia and Eritrea has had a strong body of believers since the infancy of Christianity, these regions only gained autocephaly in 1963 and 1994 respectively. The Oriental Orthodox are distinguished from the Eastern Orthodox by doctrinal differences concerning the union of human and divine natures in the person of Jesus Christ, and the two communions separated as a consequence of the Council of Chalcedon in the year 451, although there have been recent moves towards reconciliation. Since these groups are relatively obscure in the West, literature on them has sometimes included the Church of the East, which, like the Oriental Orthodox, originated in the 1st century A.D., but has not been in communion with them since before the Council of Ephesus of 431.

Largely aniconic, the Church of the East represents a third Eastern Christian tradition in its own right. In recent centuries, it has split into three Churches. The largest (since the early 20th century) is the Baghdad-based Chaldean Catholic Church formed from groups that entered communion with Rome at different times, beginning in 1552. The second-largest is what since 1976 is officially called the Assyrian Church of the East and which from 1933 to 2015 was headquartered first in Cyprus and then in the United States, but whose present Catholicos-Patriarch, Gewargis III, elected in 2015, lives in Erbil, Iraq. The third is the Ancient Church of the East, distinct since 1964 and headed by Addai II Giwargis, resident in Baghdad.

There are also the Eastern Catholic Churches, most of which are counterparts of those listed above, sharing with them the same theological and liturgical traditions, but differing from them in that they recognize the Bishop of Rome as the universal head of the Church. They are fully part of the Catholic Church, on the same level juridically as the Latin Church. Eastern Catholics generally do not describe themselves as "Roman Catholics", a term they associate with membership of the Latin Church, and speak of themselves in relation to whichever Church they belong to: Maronites, Melkites, Ukrainian Catholics, Coptic Catholics, Chaldean Catholics, etc.

The smallest Eastern Christian group, founded in early 20th century, is Eastern Lutheranism, which uses Byzantine Rite liturgy while retaining Lutheran traditions; an example is the Ukrainian Lutheran Church. Eastern Lutheranism is considered part of Eastern Protestant denominational movement.

=== Western Christianity ===
The Latin portion of the Catholic Church, along with Protestantism, comprise the three major divisions of Christianity in the Western world. Catholics do not describe themselves as a denomination but rather as the original Church, from which all other branches broke off in schism. The Baptist, Methodist, and Lutheran churches are generally considered to be Protestant denominations, although strictly speaking, of these three, only the Lutherans took part in the official Protestation at Speyer after the decree of the Second Diet of Speyer mandated the burning of Luther's works and the end of the Protestant Reformation. Anglicanism is generally classified as Protestant, being originally seen as a via media, or middle way between Lutheranism and Reformed Christianity, and since the Oxford Movement of the 19th century, some Anglican writers of Anglo-Catholic churchmanship emphasize a more catholic understanding of the church and characterize it as being both Protestant and Catholic. A case is sometimes also made to regard Lutheranism in a similar way, considering the catholic character of its foundational documents (the Augsburg Confession and other documents contained in the Book of Concord) and its existence prior to the Anglican, Anabaptist, and Reformed churches, from which nearly all other Protestant denominations derive.

One central tenet of Catholicism (which is a common point between Catholic, Scandinavian Lutheran, Anglican, Moravian, Orthodox, and some other Churches), is its practice of apostolic succession. "Apostle" means "one who is sent out". Jesus commissioned the first twelve apostles, and they, in turn laid hands on subsequent church leaders to ordain (commission) them for ministry. In this manner, Catholics and Anglicans trace their ordained ministers all the way back to the original Twelve.

Catholics believe that the Pope has authority which can be traced directly to the apostle Peter whom they hold to be the original head of and first Pope of the Church. There are smaller churches, such as the Old Catholic Church which rejected the definition of Papal Infallibility at the First Vatican Council, as well as Evangelical Catholics and Anglo-Catholics, who are Lutherans and Anglicans that believe that Lutheranism and Anglicanism, respectively, are a continuation of historical Catholicism and who incorporate many Catholic beliefs and practices. The Catholic Church refers to itself simply by the terms Catholic and Catholicism (which mean universal).

Some Catholics, based on a strict interpretation of extra ecclesiam nulla salus ("Outside the Church, there is no salvation"), reject any notion those outside its communion could be regarded as part of any true Catholic Christian faith. This is called Feeneyism, which is considered a heresy by the Catholic Church, and was rejected by the Second Vatican Council (1962–1965). Catholicism has a hierarchical structure in which supreme authority for matters of faith and practice are the exclusive domain of the Pope, who sits on the Throne of Peter, and the bishops when acting in union with him.

Each Protestant movement has developed freely, and many have split over theological issues. For instance, a number of movements grew out of spiritual revivals, such as Pentecostalism. Doctrinal issues and matters of conscience have also divided Protestants. Still others formed out of administrative issues; Methodism branched off as its own group of denominations when the American Revolutionary War complicated the movement's ability to ordain ministers (it had begun as a movement within the Church of England). In Methodism's case, it has undergone a number of administrative schisms and mergers with other denominations (especially those associated with the holiness movement in the 20th century).

The Anabaptist tradition, made up of the Amish, Hutterites, and Mennonites, rejected the Catholic and Lutheran doctrines of infant baptism; this tradition is also noted for its belief in pacifism. Many Anabaptists do not see themselves as Protestant, but a separate tradition altogether.

Some denominations which arose alongside the Western Christian tradition consider themselves Christian, but neither Catholic nor wholly Protestant, such as the Religious Society of Friends (Quakers). Quakerism began as an evangelical Christian movement in 17th century England, eschewing priests and all formal Anglican or Catholic sacraments in their worship, including many of those practices that remained among the stridently Protestant Puritans such as baptism with water. They were known in America for helping with the Underground Railroad, and like the Mennonites, Quakers traditionally refrain from participation in war.

Many churches with roots in Restorationism reject being identified as Protestant or even as a denomination at all, as they use only the Bible and not creeds, and model the church after what they feel is the first-century church found in scripture; the Churches of Christ are one example; African Initiated Churches, like Kimbanguism, mostly fall within Protestantism, with varying degrees of syncretism. The measure of mutual acceptance between the denominations and movements varies, but is growing largely due to the ecumenical movement in the 20th century and overarching Christian bodies such as the World Council of Churches.

=== Christians with Jewish roots ===
Messianic Jews maintain a Jewish identity while accepting Jesus as the Messiah and the New Testament as authoritative. After the founding of the church, the disciples of Jesus generally retained their ethnic origins while accepting the Gospel message. The first church council was called in Jerusalem to address just this issue, and the deciding opinion was written by James the Just, the first bishop of Jerusalem and a pivotal figure in the Christian movement. The history of Messianic Judaism includes many movements and groups and defies any simple classification scheme.

The 19th century saw at least 250,000 Jews convert to Christianity according to existing records of various societies. Data from the Pew Research Center has it that, as of 2013, about 1.6 million adult American Jews identify themselves as Christians, most as Protestants. According to the same data, most of the Jews who identify themselves as some sort of Christian (1.6 million) were raised as Jews or are Jews by ancestry.

== Modern history ==
=== Unitarianism ===
Within Italy, Poland, Lithuania, Transylvania, Hungary and Romania Unitarian Churches emerged from the Reformed tradition in the 16th century. They adopted the Anabaptist doctrine of credobaptism. The Unitarian Church of Transylvania is an example of such a denomination that arose in this era and is represented in the Protestant Theological Institute of Cluj. Due to their rejection of the Athanasian Creed which contains the doctrine of the Trinity, many mainstream Christian Churches do not recognize Unitarians as Christians.

=== Restorationism ===
==== Second Great Awakening ====
The Stone–Campbell Restoration Movement began on the American frontier during the Second Great Awakening (1790–1870) of the early 19th century. The movement sought to restore the church and "the unification of all Christians in a single body patterned after the church of the New Testament." Members do not identify as Protestant but simply as Christian.

The Restoration Movement developed from several independent efforts to return to apostolic Christianity, but two groups, which independently developed similar approaches to the Christian faith, were particularly important. The first, led by Barton W. Stone, began at Cane Ridge, Kentucky and called themselves simply as "Christians". The second began in western Pennsylvania and Virginia (now West Virginia) and was led by Thomas Campbell and his son, Alexander Campbell; they used the name "Disciples of Christ". Both groups sought to restore the whole Christian church on the pattern set forth in the New Testament, and both believed that creeds kept Christianity divided. In 1832 they joined in fellowship with a handshake.

Among other things, they were united in the belief that Jesus is the Christ, the Son of God; that Christians should celebrate the Lord's Supper on the first day of each week; and that baptism of adult believers by immersion in water is a necessary condition for salvation. Because the founders wanted to abandon all denominational labels, they used the biblical names for the followers of Jesus. Both groups promoted a return to the purposes of the 1st-century churches as described in the New Testament. One historian of the movement has argued that it was primarily a unity movement, with the restoration motif playing a subordinate role.

The Restoration Movement has since divided into multiple separate groups. There are three main branches in the US: the Churches of Christ, the Christian churches and churches of Christ, and the Christian Church (Disciples of Christ). Other U.S.-based groups affiliated with the movement are the International Churches of Christ and the International Christian Churches. Non-U.S. groups include the Churches of Christ in Australia, the Evangelical Christian Church in Canada, the Churches of Christ in Europe. The Plymouth Brethren are a similar though historically unrelated group which originated in the United Kingdom. Some churches, such as Churches of Christ or the Plymouth Brethren reject formal ties with other churches within the movement.

Other Christian groups originating during the Second Great Awakening including the Adventist movement, the Jehovah's Witnesses, and Christian Science, founded within fifty years of one another, all consider themselves to be restorative of primitive Christianity and the early church. Some Baptist churches with Landmarkist views have similar beliefs concerning their connection with primitive Christianity.

==== Latter Day Saint movement ====
Most Latter Day Saint denominations are derived from the Church of Christ (Latter Day Saints) established by Joseph Smith in 1830, which is categorized as a Restorationist denomination. The largest worldwide denomination is the Church of Jesus Christ of Latter-day Saints, colloquially referred to as Mormonism. Various considerably smaller sects broke from this movement after its relocation to the Rocky Mountains in the mid-1800s. Several of these broke away over the abandonment of practicing plural marriage after the 1890 Manifesto. Most of the "Prairie Saint" denominations (see below) were established after Smith's death by the remnants of the Latter Day Saints who did not go west with Brigham Young. Many of these opposed some of the 1840s theological developments in favor of 1830s theological understandings and practices. Other denominations are defined by either a belief in Joseph Smith as a prophet or acceptance of the Book of Mormon as scripture. Mormons generally consider themselves to be restorationist, believing that Smith, as prophet, seer, and revelator, restored the original and true Church of Christ to the earth. Latter Day Saint denominations are regarded by other Christians as being nontrinitarian, with them believing in a Godhead comprising the Father, Son, and Holy Spirit as separate personages united in purpose, regarding traditional definitions of the Trinity as aberrations of true doctrine and emblematic of the Great Apostasy but they do not accept certain trinitarian definitions in the post-apostolic creeds, such as the Athanasian Creed.

=== Spiritual Christianity ===
Spiritual Christianity in North America, inclusive of the Doukhobors, Dukh-i-zhizniki, Molokans, Pryguny, Sons of Freedom, Subbotniki and numerous tribal faiths, have roots in Old Russia, and each maintain unique traditions. The Doukhobors have maintained close association with Mennonite Anabaptist Christians and Quaker Christians due to analogous religious practices; all of these groups are furthermore collectively considered to be peace churches due to their official belief in pacifism.

=== Other movements ===
Protestant denominations have shown a strong tendency towards diversification and fragmentation, giving rise to numerous churches and movements, especially in Anglo-American religious history, where the process is cast in terms of a series of "Great Awakenings".

The most recent wave of diversification, known as the Fourth Great Awakening took place during the 1960s to 1980s and resulted in phenomena such as the Charismatic Movement, the Jesus movement, and a number of parachurch organizations based in Evangelicalism.

Many independent churches and movements consider themselves to be non-denominational, but may vary greatly in doctrine. Many of these, like the local churches movement, reflect the core teachings of traditional Christianity. Others however, such as The Way International, have been denounced as cults by the Christian anti-cult movement. Further, others may have similar doctrine to mainline churches but incorporate a multi-faith and ecumenical model such as the Interfaith-Ecumenical Church (IEC) that is based entirely in a virtual and international model.

Two movements, which are entirely unrelated in their founding, but share a common element of an additional Messiah (or incarnation of Christ) are the Unification Church and the Rastafari movement. These movements fall outside of traditional taxonomies of Christian groups, though both cite the Christian Bible as a basis for their beliefs.

Syncretism of Christian beliefs with local and tribal religions is a phenomenon that occurs throughout the world. An example of this is the Native American Church. The ceremonies of this group are strongly tied to the use of peyote. (Parallels may be drawn here with the Rastafari spiritual use of cannabis.) While traditions vary from tribe to tribe, they often include a belief in Jesus as a Native American cultural hero, an intercessor for man, or a spiritual guardian; belief in the Bible; and an association of Jesus with peyote.

There are also some Christians that reject organized religion altogether. Some Christian anarchists—often those of a Protestant background—believe that the original teachings of Jesus were corrupted by Roman statism (compare Early Christianity and State church of the Roman Empire), and that earthly authority such as government, or indeed the established Church, do not and should not have power over them. Following "The Golden Rule", many oppose the use of physical force in any circumstance, and advocate nonviolence. The Russian novelist Leo Tolstoy wrote The Kingdom of God Is Within You, and was a Christian anarchist.

== See also ==
- Christian tradition
- Great Church
- List of Christian denominations
- List of Christian denominations by number of members
