= Gebhard Fürst =

Roman Catholic bishop

His Excellency Gebhard Fürst
- Bishop Emeritus of Rottenburg-Stuttgart
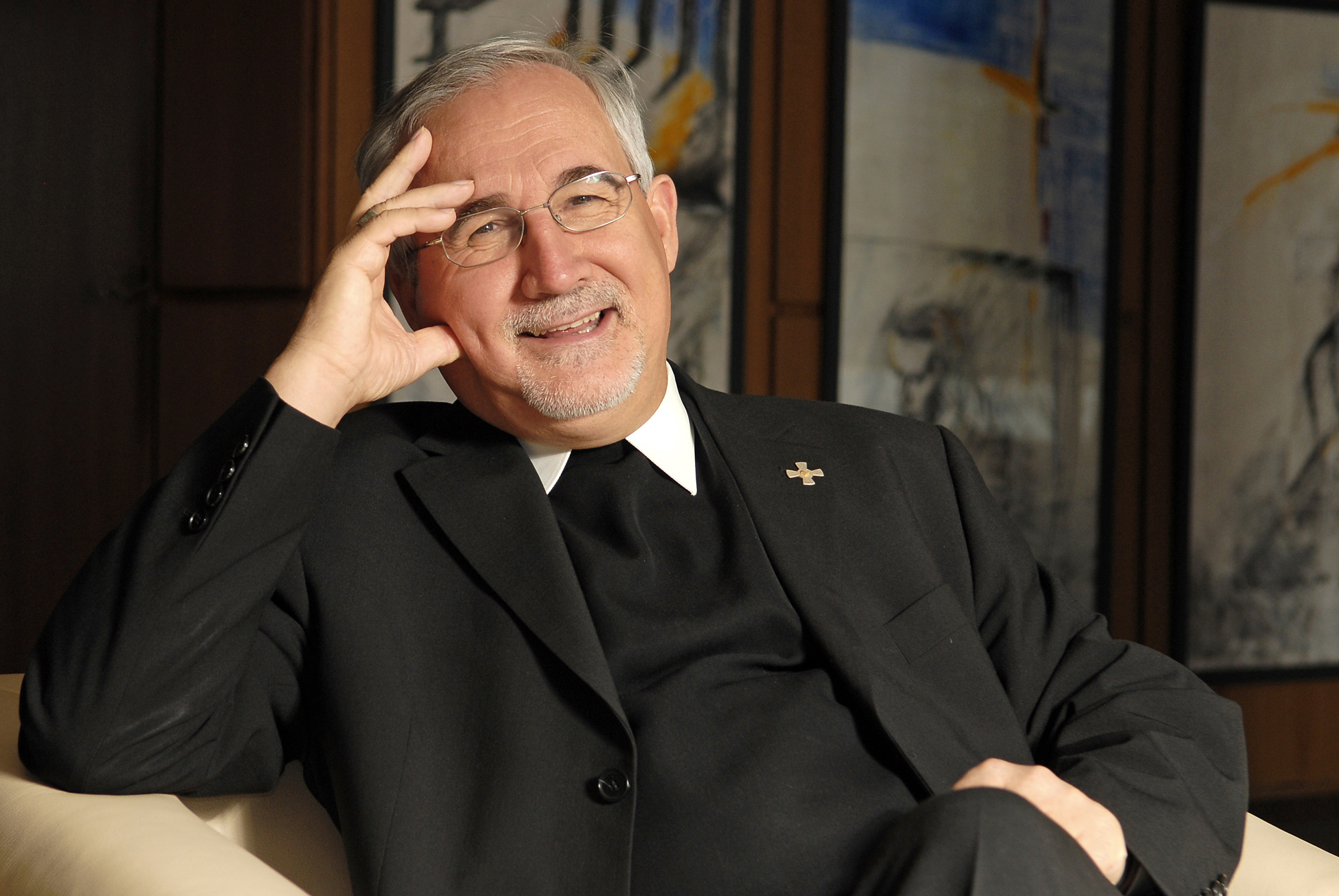
- Fürst in 2008
- Church: Roman Catholic
- Diocese: Diocese of Rottenburg-Stuttgart
- Appointed: 7 July 2000
- Installed: 17 September 2000
- Term ended: 4 December 2023
- Predecessor: Walter Kasper
- Successor: Klaus Krämer

Orders
- Ordination: 27 March 1977 by Georg Moser
- Consecration: 17 September 2000 by Oskar Saier

Personal details
- Born: 2 December 1948 (age 77) Bietigheim-Bissingen, Württemberg-Baden, Germany (present-day Baden-Württemberg)
- Motto: Propter Nostram Salutem (For Our Health)
- Coat of arms

Styles of Gebhard Fürst
- Reference style: The Most Reverend
- Spoken style: Your Excellency
- Religious style: Monsignor
- Posthumous style: not applicable

Gebhard Fürst (born 2 December 1948) is a German prelate of the Catholic Church who was the Bishop of Rottenburg-Stuttgart from 2000 to 2023.

== Biography ==
Fürst was born on 2 December 1948 in Bietigheim, Württemberg-Baden. His father was a gardener. He attended the Collegium Ambrosianum in Tübingen, where he studied Greek and Hebrew, in 1969. He then studied theology at the Faculty of Catholic Theology at the University of Tübingen (1970) and at the University of Vienna from 1971 to 1973. He entered the Seminary of Rottenburg-Stuttgart in Rottenburg am Neckar.

He was ordained a deacon on 13 December 1975 and began his service in Nürtingen in January 1976. He was ordained a priest by Bishop Georg Moser in the Basilica of St. Vitus in Ellwangen an der Jagst on 27 March 1977.

He was parish vicar in Nürtingen in 1977/78. From 1979 to 1986 he taught theology in Tübingen. From 1986 to 2000, he was director of the Academy of the Diocese of Rottenburg-Stuttgart, where developed some of the earliest studies of women in the Church, environmental issues, and clerical sexual abuse.

He was a member of the Caucus of Bishop Ordinaries. In 1987, he received his doctorate in fundamental theology for his work "Sprache als metaphorischer Prozess. Johann Gottfried Herders hermeneutische Theorie der Sprache" ("Speech as a metaphorical process. Johann Gottfried Herder's Hermeneutic Theory of Language"). In 1993, he was chair of the leadership circle of the Catholic Academy of Germany.

Fürst was made an honorary chaplain to the Pope (Monsignor) on 4 January 1999.

On 7 July 2000, Pope John Paul II named him Bishop of Rottenburg-Stuttgart. He received his episcopal consecration from Oskar Saier, Archbishop of Freiburg, and was installed on 17 September. He was the second youngest bishop in Germany at the time. He chose as his episcopal motto "Proper nostram saluted".

Fürst has chaired the Prize Committee of the "Aleksandr Men Prize for Cultural Ecumenism". He has been a member of the Culture Board of the State Capital of Stuttgart, a member in the Board of Trustees of the Academy of the Diocese of Rottenburg-Stuttgart, and a member of the Board of Directors of the Society of Friends and Patrons of the Academy. Fürst has further memberships in the History Club of the Diocese of Rottenburg-Stuttgart, in the Diocesan Institute, in the Theological Commission of the Consortium of the Christian Church in Baden-Württemberg (ACK), and in the Women's Commission of the Diocese of Rottenburg-Stuttgart (since 1999).

Fürst was a member of the National Ethics Council of Germany as the representative of the Catholic Church from its creation in 2001 to May 2005. He has been a member of the Stuttgart chapter of the Union of Catholic German Student Fraternities. In 2007 he became chairman of the Journalism Commission of the German Bishops Conference.

In 2009, Fürst criticized the lifting of the excommunication of Bishop Richard Williamson and said that it had led to "external and internal alienation from the church on the part of many believers, to a betrayal of trust especially among Jewish sisters and brothers in their relationship to the Church, and to a considerable disturbance in the Christian-Jewish dialogue".

In 2017, Fürst supported the ordination of women as deacons.

During the COVID-19 pandemic, Fürst criticized vaccination opponents as lacking social solidarity with the vulnerable and called them "downright selfish and extremely hurtful".

Pope Francis accepted his resignation on 4 December 2023.

== Selected works ==
His published works include:

- Sprache als metaphorischer Prozess: Johann Gottfried Herders hermeneutische Theorie der Sprache, Mainz: Matthias-Grünewald-Verl, 1988.
- "'Kirche braucht Kulturstationen'. Ein Gespräch mit Akademiedirektor Gebhard Fürst," in: Herder Korrespondenz 53 (1999)182-187.
- Zäsur: Generationswechsel in der katholischen Theologie/Akademie der Diözese Rottenburg-Stuttgart. Hrsg. von Gebhard Fürst. - Stuttgart: Akad. der Diözese Rottenburg-Stuttgart, 1997.
- Höllenerfahrungen in Literatur und Kunst (1998)
- Dialog als Selbstvollzug der Kirche? Ed. Gebhard Fürst. - Freiburg im Breisgau: Herder, 1997.
- Dialog als Selbstvollzug der Kirche? (Quaestiones disputatae 166) Hrsg.: Gebhard Fürst. Verlag Herder Freiburg i. Br./Basel/Wien 1997
- Das heilige Buch der Menschen. Johann Gottfried Herders hermeneutische Sprachtheorie der Bibel. Ein Beitrag zur Herder-Forschung, in: Fides quaerens intellectum: Beiträge zur Fundamentaltheologie. [Max Seckler zum 65. Geburtstag]/Ed. Michael Kessler. Tübingen 1992
- Wechselbekenntnisse: auf dem Weg zur Normalität; aus einer Ost-West-Begegnung in turbulenter Zeit, Ed. Gebhard Fürst, Stuttgart: Akad. der Diözese Rottenburg-Stuttgart, 1992.
- Dialog und Gastfreundschaft: 40 Jahre Akademie der Diözese Rottenburg-Stuttgart 1951 – 1991, [Ed. der Akademie der Diözese Rottenburg-Stuttgart. Verantw. für den Inhalt: Gebhard Fürst]. - Stuttgart: Akad. der Diözese Rottenburg-Stuttgart

| Preceded by Walter Kasper | Bishop of Rottenburg-Stuttgart; 2000–2023 | Incumbent |
