= Brian Farrell (bishop) =

Irish Roman Catholic prelate (born 1944)

The Most Reverend Brian Farrell LC LPhil LTh DTh
- Secretary Emeritus of the Dicastery for Promoting Christian Unity
- Church: Roman Catholic
- Appointed: 19 December 2002
- Installed: 6 January 2003 (Abitinae)
- Term ended: 23 February 2024
- Predecessor: Marc Ouellet
- Successor: Flavio Pace
- Other post: Titular Bishop of Abitinae
- Previous post: Vice-president of the Commission for Religious Relations with the Jews

Orders
- Ordination: 26 November 1969 by Ildebrando Antoniutti
- Consecration: 6 January 2003 by Pope John Paul II

Personal details
- Born: 8 February 1944 (age 82) Drimnagh, Dublin, Ireland
- Education: Pontifical Gregorian University; Pontifical University of Saint Thomas Aquinas

Styles of Brian Farrell
- Reference style: The Most Reverend
- Spoken style: Your Grace
- Religious style: Bishop

Brian Farrell, LC (born 8 February 1944) is an Irish Catholic prelate who spent his career in the Roman Curia beginning in 1981, ending as secretary of the Dicastery for Promoting Christian Unity from 2002 to 2024. He is a member of the Legionaries of Christ.

== Early life and education ==
Farrell was born in Drimnagh, Dublin on 8 February 1944. He is the older brother of Kevin Farrell, Camerlengo of the Holy Roman Church, Prefect of the Dicastery for the Laity, Family and Life and Bishop Emeritus of Dallas.

Farrell entered the congregation of the Legionaries of Christ in 1961, studying at the congregation House of Studies in Salamanca, Spain, until 1963, and continuing his training at the Pontifical Gregorian University, Rome, and in the United States.

He was ordained a priest for the Legionaries of Christ on 26 November 1969.

== Presbyteral ministry ==
Following ordination, Farrell served as director of the Legionaries of Christ seminary in Orange, Connecticut, United States, before returning to Rome to complete a licentiate in philosophy at the Pontifical Gregorian University and a licentiate in theology at the Pontifical University of Saint Thomas Aquinas.

He returned to the Pontifical Gregorian University, where he completed a doctorate in dogmatic theology in 1981 with a thesis on Communicatio in Sacris: A Theological Study of the Policy Adopted by the Second Vatican Council, under the direction of Karl Becker.

From 1 October 1981 to 19 December 2002, Farrell worked at the Holy See Secretariat of State, becoming the head of the English desk in its Office of General Affairs on 1 January 1999. As an official of the Secretariat of State, he opposed the Health (Family Planning) (Amendment) Act 1985, permitting the sale of condoms in Ireland without having to present a prescription.

== Episcopal ministry ==
Farrell was appointed secretary of the Pontifical Council for Promoting Christian Unity and titular bishop-elect of Abitinae by Pope John Paul II on 19 December 2002. He was consecrated by Pope John Paul II on 6 January 2003 at St Peter's Basilica, Rome.

His appointment was confirmed by Pope Francis on 19 February 2014. As secretary of the Pontifical Council for Promoting Christian Unity, Farrell was also ex officio vice-president of the Commission for Religious Relations with the Jews.

In 2003, he contributed an article to the catalogue for "The Tension of Origin", an exhibition of works by Italian artist Giovanni Bonaldi which engaged in Judaeo-Christian dialogue through artistic expression.

In 2010, Farrell was one of four advisors to Velasio de Paolis when de Paolis was the papal delegate tasked with reorganising the Legionaries of Christ.

He retired as secretary of the Dicastery for Promoting Christian Unity on 23 February 2024.

Catholic Church titles
Preceded by Marc Ouellet	Secretary of the Dicastery for Promoting Christian Unity; 2002-2024	Succeeded by Flavio Pace
