= Joint International Commission for Theological Dialogue between the Catholic Church and the Oriental Orthodox Churches =

The division between the Oriental Orthodox Churches and the Catholic Church can be traced to the years following the Council of Chalcedon (451) whose Christological teaching the Oriental Orthodox did not accept.

Attempts were made to reconcile with some of the Oriental Orthodox Churches at the Council of Florence (1438–1445), but none of these provided a lasting solution. In 1443, the Orthodox Patriarchs of Jerusalem, Alexandria, and Antioch held a council in Jerusalem where they condemned the union.

Relations began to improve dramatically, however, after the Catholic Church's Second Vatican Council (1962–1965). There were several important exchanges of visits between Popes and heads of the Oriental Orthodox Churches, and semi-official theological conversations sponsored by the Pro Oriente Foundation in Vienna. This process of reconciliation led to the establishment of an official dialogue between the Catholic and Oriental Orthodox Churches in 2003.

== Setting up the Dialogue ==
In 2003 a joint committee to prepare for the establishment of an international dialogue between the Catholic Church and the Oriental Orthodox Churches was set up and met in Rome. At this meeting it was announced that the Co-Chairmen of the new International Joint Commission for Theological Dialogue between the Catholic Church and the Oriental Orthodox Churches would be Metropolitan Bishoy of Damiette, General Secretary of the Holy Synod of the Coptic Orthodox Church, and Cardinal Walter Kasper, President of the Pontifical Council for Promoting Christian Unity. The Preparatory Committee also established rules of membership in the dialogue, a work plan and procedures, as well as a timetable for the Joint Commission’s work.

Altogether seven Oriental Orthodox Churches are participating in the dialogue. These are the Coptic Orthodox Church, the Syriac Orthodox Church, the Armenian Catholicossate of Etchmiadzin, the Armenian Catholicossate of Cilicia, the Ethiopian Orthodox Church, the Eritrean Orthodox Church, and the Malankara Orthodox Syrian Church.

In 2010 Cardinal Kurt Koch succeeded Cardinal Walter Kasper as Catholic Co-Chairman of the dialogue.

== Progress of the Dialogue ==
The first plenary meeting of the Joint Commission took place in Cairo in January 2004. Iit has been meeting annually since that time. In January 2009, at its sixth meeting, the Commission finalized its first agreed statement, entitled "Nature, Constitution, and Mission of the Church." It treats some fundamental themes in ecclesiology such as the relationship between the Trinity and the Church, attributes of the Church, Bishops in Apostolic Succession, synodality and primacies in the Church, and the Church’s mission. The text also outlines a number of areas that need further study, and will be considered at a future stage of the dialogue.

At its seventh meeting in January 2010, the commission focused on the ways in which the full communion that existed between the Catholic and Oriental Orthodox churches up to the mid-fifth century was expressed. This study continued at the eighth meeting of the commission, which took place in Rome in January 2011, and at the ninth meeting in Addis Ababa, Ethiopia, in January 2012. At the Addis Ababa meeting a subcommittee was established with the task of preparing a draft common text on this topic. The subcommittee met in Rome in September 2012 and produced a preliminary draft text for consideration at the tenth meeting, held in Rome in January 2013. At the 2013 meeting the draft was examined, and new papers were presented on the common veneration of saints as a sign of full communion among the churches. The eleventh meeting took place from January 28 to February 1, 2014, in Pampakuda, Kerala State, India, hosted by the Malankara Orthodox Syrian Church. Papers were presented on the development of eucharistic prayers and pilgrimages as signs of full communion in the early centuries, and more work was done on the proposed agreed statement. The results of those studies were incorporated into the draft text which was considered again at the twelfth meeting, which took place in Rome from January 25 to 30, 2015. After a number of further amendments were made, the document was approved for publication. Its full title is The Exercise of Communion in the Life of the Early Church and its Implications for our Search for Communion Today.

At the January 2015 Rome meeting and again in Cairo in February 2016 papers were presented on the Sacraments of Initiation. The Commission met in Rome for its Fourteenth Meeting from January 23 to 27, 2017. The main theme of that meeting was the Eucharist. The Fifteenth Meeting took place in Etchmiadzin, Armenia, from January 29 to February 4, 2018, and was hosted by the Catholiosate of All Armenians. Papers were presented on the sacraments of Holy Orders, Penance (reconciliation) and Anointing of the Sick. The sixteenth meeting took place in Rome January 27 to February 2, 2019, and was devoted to a study of the sacrament of marriage. Due to the death of Metropolitan Bishoy the previous October, the Oriental Orthodox members chose Bishop Kyrillos of the Coptic Orthodox Church as the new Oriental Orthodox Co-Chairman. The seventeenth meeting took place in late January 2020 in Atchaneh, Lebanon, hosted by the Syrian Orthodox Church. It focused on the nature and number of the sacraments, and set in motion the drafting of an eventual agreed statement on the sacraments.

Meetings have continued in the 2020s. In 2022, the Dicastery for Promoting Christian Unity published a document on the sacraments which was signed in Rome by the Catholic Cardinal Kurt Koch and the Coptic Orthodox Bishop Kyrillos.

The Commission has been supporting dialogue and education, with Oriental Orthodox religious travelling to Rome have already come to Rome and Catholic priests travelling to Etchmiadzin.

The Commission met in September 2025 in Crete, to work on documents on Infallibility.

This work continued when the Commission met in June 2026 in Hungary.

== See also ==
- Oriental Orthodoxy
- Catholic Church
- Pontifical Council for Promoting Christian Unity
