= Martyrs of Abitinae =

Roman Catholic saints

- Died: 304 AD; North Africa
- Venerated in: Catholic Church
- Feast: February 12

The Martyrs of Abitinae (or Abitinian Martyrs) were a group of 49 Christians found guilty, in 304, during the reign of the Emperor Diocletian, of having illegally celebrated Sunday worship at Abitinae, a town in the Roman province of Africa. The town is frequently referred to as Abitina, but the form indicated in the Annuario Pontificio (and elsewhere) is Abitinae. The plural form Abitinae is that which Saint Augustine of Hippo used when writing his De baptismo in 400 or 401.

On February 24 of the year before, Diocletian had published his first edict against the Christians, ordering the destruction of Christian scriptures and places of worship across the Empire, and prohibiting Christians from assembling for worship.

Though Fundanus, the local bishop in Abitinae, obeyed the edict and handed the scriptures of the church over to the authorities, some of the Christians continued to meet illegally under the priest Saturninus. They were arrested and brought before the local magistrates, who sent them to Carthage, the capital of the province, for trial.

The trial took place on February 12 before the proconsul Anullinus. One of the group was Dativus, a senator. Under interrogation he declared that he was a Christian and had taken part in the meeting of the Christians, but even under torture he at first refused to say who had presided over it. During this interrogation, the advocate Fortunatianus, a brother of Victoria, one of the accused, denounced Dativus of having enticed her and other naïve young girls to attend the service; but Victoria declared she had gone entirely of her own accord. Interrupting the torture, the proconsul again asked Dativus whether he had taken part in the meeting. Dativus again declared that he had. Then, when asked who had been the instigator, he replied: "The priest Saturninus and all of us." He was then taken to prison and died soon after of his wounds.

The priest Saturninus was then interrogated and held firm even under torture. His example was followed by all the others, both men and women. They included his four children.

Emeritus, who declared that the Christians had met in his house, was asked why he had violated the emperor's command. He replied: "Sine dominico non possumus" - we cannot live without this thing of the Lord. Often abbreviated "non possumus", this phrase was to echo down the ages. Meaning thing of the Lord, "dominico" was referring to the Eucharist. It was to give the new name for Sunday in the Romance languages. The emperor had declared the Eucharist illegal, but the prisoners had chosen to participate in it even at the risk of being tortured and sentenced to death.

Saint Restituta is sometimes considered one of the Martyrs of Abitinae.

== List of the Martyrs of Abitinae ==
The feast of the Martyrs of Abitinae is on February 12. Under that date the Roman Martyrology records the names of all forty-nine:

- Saturninus, Presbyter
- Saturninus, son of Saturninus, Reader
- Felix, son of Saturninus, Reader
- Maria, daughter of Saturninus
- Hilarion, infant son of Saturninus
- Dativus, also known as Sanator
- Felix
- another Felix
- Emeritus, Reader
- Ampelius, Reader
- Benignus, infant son of Ampelius
- Rogatianus
- Quintus
- Maximianus or Maximus
- Telica or Tazelita
- another Rogatianus
- Rogatus
- Ianuarius
- Cassianus
- Victorianus
- Vincentius
- Caecilianus
- Restituta
- Prima
- Eva
- yet another Rogatianus
- Givalius
- Rogatus
- Pomponia
- Secunda
- Ianuaria
- Saturnina
- Martinus
- Clautus
- Felix junior
- Margarits
- Maior
- Honorata
- Regiola
- Victorinus
- Pelusius
- Faustus
- Dacianus
- Matrona
- Caecilia
- Victoria, a virgin from Carthage
- Berectina
- Secunda
- Matrona
- Ianuaria
