= Dicastery for Promoting Christian Unity =

Roman Catholic Church department, active since the 1960s

- Dicasterium ad unitatem christianorum fovendam
- Coat of arms of the Holy See

Dicastery overview
- Formed: June 5, 1960; 66 years ago
- Preceding agencies: Secretariat for Promoting Christian Unity; Pontifical Council for Promoting Christian Unity
- Type: Dicastery
- Headquarters: Via della Conciliazione, 5, 00193 Rome, Italy
- Dicastery executives: Cardinal Kurt Koch, Prefect; Flavio Pace, Secretary; Andrea Palmieri, Under Secretary
- Website: www.christianunity.va

The Dicastery for Promoting Christian Unity (Italian: Dicastero per la promozione dell'unità dei cristiani, Latin: Dicasterium ad unitatem christianorum fovendam), previously named the Pontifical Council for Promoting Christian Unity (PCPCU), is a dicastery within the Holy See whose origins are associated with the Second Vatican Council which met intermittently from 1962 to 1965.

== Origins ==
Pope John XXIII wanted the Catholic Church to engage in the contemporary ecumenical movement. He established a Secretariat for Promoting Christian Unity (SPCU) on 5 June 1960 as one of the preparatory commissions for the council, and appointed Cardinal Augustin Bea as its first president. The secretariat invited other churches and world communions to send observers to the council.

The Secretariat for Promoting Christian Unity prepared and presented a number of documents to the council:

- Ecumenism (Unitatis redintegratio);
- Non-Christian religions (Nostra aetate);
- Religious liberty (Dignitatis humanae);
- With the doctrinal commission, the Dogmatic Constitution on Divine Revelation (Dei verbum).

Following the council, in 1966 Pope Paul VI confirmed the Secretariat for Promoting Christian Unity as a permanent dicastery of the Holy See.

In the apostolic constitution Pastor bonus (28 June 1988), Pope John Paul II renamed the secretariat the Pontifical Council for Promoting Christian Unity.

The PCPCU has two sections dealing with:

- The Eastern Churches - The Eastern and Oriental Orthodox Churches as well as the Assyrian Church of the East;
- The Western Churches and Ecclesial Communities and the World Council of Churches.

== Purpose ==
The dicastery has a twofold role:

- The promotion within the Catholic Church of an authentic ecumenical spirit according to the conciliar decree Unitatis redintegratio;
- To develop dialogue and collaboration with the other churches and world communions.

Since its creation, it has also established a cordial cooperation with the World Council of Churches (WCC). Twelve Catholic theologians have been members of the WCC's Faith and Order Commission since 1968.

The PCPCU is responsible for naming Catholic observers at various ecumenical gatherings and in its turn invites observers or "fraternal delegates" of other churches or ecclesial communities to major events of the Catholic Church.

At present, the PCPCU is engaged in an international theological dialogue with each of the following churches and world communions:

- The Assyrian Church of the East
- The Eastern Orthodox Church;
- The Oriental Orthodox churches;
- The Malankara Orthodox Syrian Church;
- The Anglican Communion;
- The International Lutheran Council;
- The Lutheran World Federation;
- The World Alliance of Reformed Churches;
- The World Methodist Council;
- The Baptist World Alliance;
- The Christian Church (Disciples of Christ);
- The World Evangelical Alliance;
- Some Pentecostal groups.

== Structure ==
Directed by a Cardinal President, assisted by a Secretary, a Joint Secretary, and an Under-Secretary.

Current leadership

- President: Kurt Koch, 2010–
- Secretary: Flavio Pace, 2024–
- Under-Secretary: Andrea Palmieri

Presidents

- Augustin Bea (6 June 1960 – 16 November 1968)
- Johannes Willebrands (12 April 1969 – 12 December 1989)
- Edward Cassidy (12 December 1989 – 3 March 2001)
- Walter Kasper (3 March 2001 – 1 July 2010)
- Kurt Koch (1 July 2010 – present)

Secretaries

- Johannes Willebrands (28 June 1960 – 12 April 1969)
- Jean Jérôme Hamer (12 April 1969 – 14 June 1973)
- Pierre Duprey, M. Afr. (25 April 1983 – 16 March 1999)
- Jean-Claude Périsset (16 November 1996 to 12 November 1998)
- Walter Kasper (16 March 1999 – 3 March 2001)
- Marc Ouellet (3 March 2001 – 15 November 2002)
- Brian Farrell, L.C. (19 December 2002– 23 February 2024)
- Flavio Pace (23 February 2024 – present)

== The Bible ==
The council is responsible for working with other churches on ecumenical translations of scripture, and promoted the establishment of the Catholic Biblical Federation.

== Relations with the Jews ==
The Commission of the Holy See for Religious Relations with the Jews is the responsibility of the PCPCU, while the Commission of the Holy See for Religious Relations with Muslims comes under the direction of the Pontifical Council for Interreligious Dialogue. This is because when the council was being created the Commission of the Holy See for Religious Relations with the Jews was consulted as to whether it wished to come under the Inter-Religious Dialogue Council, it declined and thus remains part of the Promoting Christian Unity Council.

== Publications ==
- Guidelines for Interconfessional Cooperation in Translating the Bible (1987)
- Directory for the Application of Principles and Norms on Ecumenism (25 Mar 1993)
- The Greek and Latin Traditions Regarding the Procession of the Holy Spirit (1996)
- The Ecumenical Dimension in the Formation of those Engaged in Pastoral Work (1997)
- The Bishop and Christian Unity: An Ecumenical Vademecum (2020)
- Ecumenism in a Time of Pandemic: From Crisis to Opportunity (A Working Paper) (2022)
- The Bishop of Rome. Primacy and synodality in ecumenical dialogues and responses to the encyclical Ut unum sint (13 Jun 2024)

== See also ==
- Joint International Commission for Theological Dialogue Between the Catholic Church and the Orthodox Church
- Joint International Commission for Theological Dialogue between the Catholic Church and the Oriental Orthodox Churches
