= Non possumus =

Latin phrase related with the martyrdom of some early Christians, AD 304

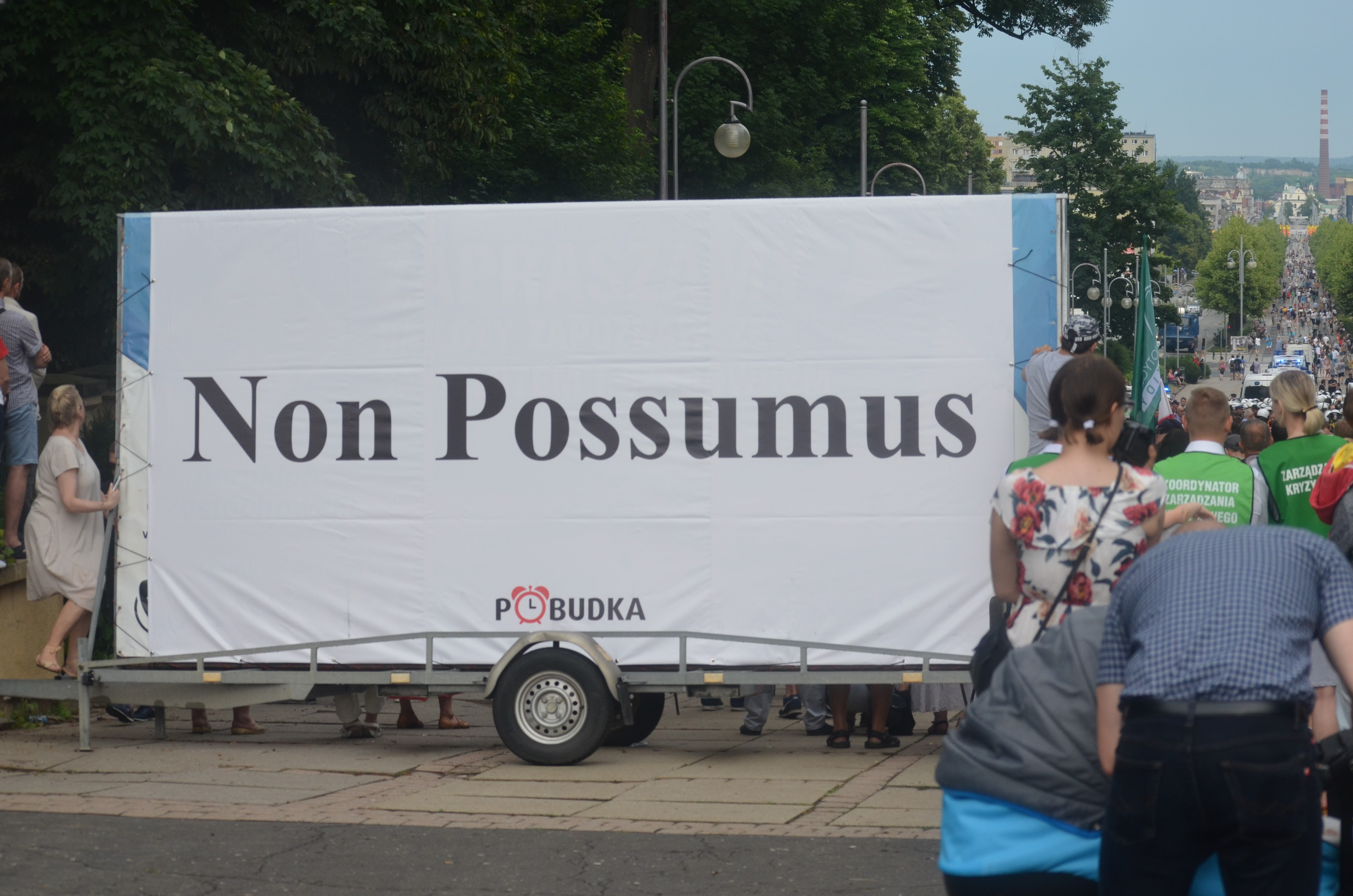
Catholics block gay rights pride march in Częstochowa

"Non possumus" is a Latin, Catholic, religious phrase that translates as "we cannot". It first originated with the Latin version of the Acts of the Apostles, with word attributed to apostles Peter and John, “for we cannot what we have seen and heard not speak”.

The fragment also gained significance with martyrdom of the Martyrs of Abitinae, who were killed in AD 304 when Roman Emperor Diocletian prohibited Christians under penalty of death to possess the Sacred Scriptures, convene on Sunday to celebrate the Holy Eucharist, and erect premises for their assemblies.

The phrase was not intended to express incapacity but, on the contrary, absolute moral determination to obey the Catholic Faith.

The full sentence of the phrase is "sine dominico non possumus" ("we cannot [live] without Sunday"). It expresses the necessity of Sunday and the Holy Eucharist for Christianity.

Another ecclesiastic use of the phrase has been attributed to Pope Leo the Great, who wrote in AD 448 that "quibus viventibus non communicavimus mortuis communicare non possumus" ("we cannot hold communion in death with those who in life were not in communion with us"). Recourse to this principle has been had to justify various ecclesiastical practices, including refusal of funeral liturgies and refusal of abrogating the ex-communication of decedents. Some have used it to object to ecumenism and general relations with non-Christians.

The phrase has been vivid throughout the life of the Church, being used by pontiffs also in troubled times such as when Pope Pius VII was arrested by the French troops of Napoleon who had again invaded the Papal States in 1809. Offered various forms of compromises in exchange for his freedom, he said to his captors: "Non debemus, non possumus, non volumus" (we must not, we cannot, we will not") and accepted his exile first to Savona and then to France until 1814.

In the 19th and 20th centuries, "non possumus" dominated the diplomacy of Popes Pius IX, Leo XIII, St. Pius X, Benedict XV, and Pius XI, especially after the capture of Rome when the Supreme Pontiff became the prisoner in the Vatican and chose to limit his contact with the outside world. It is generally thought that the Second Vatican Council reversed this attitude.

This Latin phrase is also connected with the history of Poland. On 8 May 1953 Polish bishops sent a formal letter to the party leaders of the communist People's Republic of Poland to declare their decisive refusal to subordinate the Church to the communist state. In retaliation, the government imprisoned their Primate, Cardinal Stefan Wyszyński.
