= Flavio Pace =

Italian Roman Catholic prelate (born 1977)

The Most Reverend Flavio Pace
- Secretary of the Dicastery for Promoting Christian Unity
- Church: Catholic Church
- Appointed: 23 February 2024
- Predecessor: Brian Farrell
- Other post: Titular Archbishop of Dolia (since 2024)
- Previous post: Under-Secretary of the Dicastery for the Eastern Churches (2020–2024)

Orders
- Ordination: 8 June 2002 by Carlo Maria Martini
- Consecration: 4 May 2024 by Mario Delpini

Personal details
- Born: 29 July 1977 (age 49) Monza, Italy
- Education: Pontifical Institute for Arabic and Islamic Studies
- Motto: Fove Precantes Trinitas
- Coat of arms

Flavio Pace (born 29 July 1977) is an Italian Roman Catholic prelate who has served as Secretary of the Dicastery for Promoting Christian Unity of the Roman Curia since February 2024. He previously served as Under-Secretary of the Dicastery for the Eastern Churches from 2020 to 2024. He holds the personal title of titular archbishop of Dolia.

== Early life and education ==
Flavio Pace was born in Monza in the Archdiocese of Milan. He entered the Archiepiscopal seminary of Milan in 1996. In 2010, he obtained a certificate in Islamic Studies from the Pontifical Institute for Arabic and Islamic Studies in Rome, specializing in interreligious dialogue.

== Priesthood ==
Pace was ordained a priest on 8 June 2002 by Cardinal Carlo Maria Martini for the Archdiocese of Milan. He served as parish vicar in Abbiategrasso, worked in youth ministry, taught Catholic religion in secondary schools, and served as a chaplain in a hospice until 2011.

== Roman Curia ==
In 2011, Pace entered the Roman Curia and began service in the Congregation for the Oriental Churches (later the Dicastery for the Eastern Churches). He served as attaché and later as secretary to the prefect, Cardinal Leonardo Sandri. On 3 February 2020, Pope Francis appointed him Under-Secretary of the dicastery.

== Secretary of the Dicastery for Promoting Christian Unity ==
On 23 February 2024, Pope Francis appointed Pace as Secretary of the Dicastery for Promoting Christian Unity, succeeding Archbishop Brian Farrell. He was simultaneously appointed titular archbishop of Dolia.

He received episcopal consecration on 4 May 2024 in the Milan Cathedral from Archbishop Mario Delpini, with Cardinals Leonardo Sandri and Kurt Koch as co-consecrators.

In his role, Pace assists the prefect in promoting ecumenism and dialogue among Christian Churches and ecclesial communities worldwide.

== Other activities ==
Pace has been involved in interreligious dialogue and ecumenical initiatives and has served as chaplain of the “Teresa Grillo Michel” Institute of the Little Sisters of Divine Providence.

== See also ==
- Dicastery for Promoting Christian Unity
- Roman Curia
- Catholic Church and ecumenism
