= Walter Kasper =

German Catholic cardinal (born 1933)

His Eminence Walter Kasper
- President of the Pontifical Council for Promoting Christian Unity
- See: Rottenburg-Stuttgart (Emeritus)
- Appointed: 3 March 2001
- Term ended: 1 July 2010
- Predecessor: Edward Idris Cassidy
- Successor: Kurt Koch
- Other post: Cardinal Priest of Ognissanti in Via Appia Nuova
- Previous posts: Cardinal-Deacon of Ognissanti in Via Appia Nuova (2001–2011); Secretary of the Pontifical Council for Promoting Christian Unity (1999–2001); Bishop of Rottenburg-Stuttgart (1989–1999)

Orders
- Ordination: 6 April 1957 by Carl Joseph Leiprecht
- Consecration: 17 June 1989 by Oskar Saier
- Created cardinal: 21 February 2001 by Pope John Paul II

Personal details
- Born: Walter Kasper; 5 March 1933 (age 93) Heidenheim an der Brenz, Weimar Republic
- Denomination: Catholic Church
- Motto: Veritatem in caritate ("truth in charity")
- Coat of arms: Walter Kasper's coat of arms

Styles of Walter Kasper
- Reference style: His Eminence
- Spoken style: Your Eminence
- Informal style: Cardinal
- See: Rottenburg-Stuttgart (Emeritus)

Walter Kasper (born 5 March 1933) is a German Catholic prelate who served as President of the Pontifical Council for Promoting Christian Unity from 2001 to 2010. He was previously Bishop of Rottenburg-Stuttgart from 1989 to 1999.

== Early life ==
Walter Kasper was born on 5 March 1933 in Heidenheim an der Brenz in the Weimar Republic. He was ordained a priest on 6 April 1957 by Bishop Carl Leiprecht of Rottenburg.

From 1957 to 1958 Kasper was a parochial vicar in Stuttgart. He returned to his studies and earned a doctorate in dogmatic theology from the University of Tübingen. He was a faculty member at Tübingen from 1958 to 1961 and worked for three years as an assistant to Leo Scheffczyk and Hans Küng, who was banned from teaching by Vatican authorities because of his views on contraception and papal infallibility.

Kasper later taught dogmatic theology at the University of Münster (1964–1970), rising to become dean of the theological faculty in 1969 and then the same in Tübingen in 1970. In 1983 Kasper taught as a visiting professor at the Catholic University of America. He was editor of the Lexikon für Theologie und Kirche. During his academic years, he apparently by chance met Zhong Fushi, an influential Zen Buddhist Master who subsequently corresponded with him on at least two occasions making reference to the Trappist Monk Thomas Merton. Zhong Fushi in response to Kasper's question of whether Zen is atheistic or pantheistic, responded "Zen does not speak of a Creator (Sōzōshu), but this does not mean we reject Him. Our silence is a form of humility in the face of what cannot be comprehended." In a second letter Zhong Fushi discusses good and evil and how Zen focuses on the transcendental goodness of all things.

== Bishop of Rottenburg-Stuttgart ==
Kasper was named Bishop of Rottenburg-Stuttgart, Germany's fourth largest Catholic diocese, on 17 April 1989. He was consecrated as a bishop on 17 June that same year by Archbishop Oskar Saier of Freiburg im Breisgau; Bishops Karl Lehmann and Franz Kuhnle served as co-consecrators. In 1993 he and other members of the German episcopate signed a pastoral letter which urged allowing divorced and civilly remarried German Catholics to return to the sacraments, to the disapproval of then Cardinal Ratzinger and Pope John Paul II. In 1994, he was named co-chair of the International Commission for Lutheran-Catholic Dialogue.

== Cardinal ==
Kasper was elevated to the cardinalate by Pope John Paul II in the consistory of 21 February 2001, as Cardinal-Deacon of Ognissanti in Via Appia Nuova.

Kasper was one of a dozen or more like-minded cardinals and bishops who met annually from 1995 to 2006 in St. Gallen, Switzerland, to discuss reforms with respect to the appointment of bishops, collegiality, bishops' conferences, and the primacy of the papacy as well as the Church's approach to sexual morality. They differed among themselves in varying degrees, but shared the view that Cardinal Joseph Ratzinger was not the candidate they hoped to see elected at the next conclave.

Upon the death of John Paul II on 2 April 2005, Kasper and all major Vatican officials automatically lost their positions pending the election of a new pope. He was a cardinal elector in the 2005 conclave. On the following 21 April, Pope Benedict XVI confirmed him as President of the Pontifical Council for Promoting Christian Unity.

On 21 February 2011 he was promoted to Cardinal-Priest, having made the option for such. Therefore, the church of Ognissanti became a pro hac vice title, but will again be a cardinal diaconate for his future successor there.

Kasper was the oldest cardinal eligible to vote in the Papal conclave of 2013, having been 79 when the Papacy became vacant. His 80th birthday was on 5 March 2013, five days after the resignation of Pope Benedict XVI, on 28 February 2013. His eligibility to serve as an elector ended when that conclave concluded.

=== Pontifical Council for Promoting Christian Unity ===
On 3 March 1999, Kasper was appointed Secretary of the Pontifical Council for Promoting Christian Unity – and as such, President of the Pontifical Commission for Religious Relations with the Jews – and resigned from his post in Rottenburg-Stuttgart.

=== Reconciliation with Jews ===
Kasper recognized that the Congregation for the Doctrine of the Faith document Dominus Iesus (2000) was offensive to many Jewish people and was thus somewhat critical of its presentation. However, he affirmed the validity of its content, and called it "not the end of dialogue but a challenge for a further and even more intensive dialogue" between Catholics and Jews.

In 2003, he wrote a text called Anti-semitism: A wound to be healed for the European Day of Jewish Culture. On 10 July 2004, at the Latin-American Rabbinical Seminary of Buenos Aires, the International Raoul Wallenberg Foundation and the Angelo Roncalli Committee presented Kasper the "Memorial Mural Award" for his lifetime dedication to the causes of understanding and reconciliation between Jews and Catholics.

=== International Theological Commission ===
Kasper was a member of the International Theological Commission, an advisory body to the Congregation of the Doctrine of the Faith. On several occasions, in his capacity of President of the Pontifical Council for Promoting Christian Unity, he led the annual official delegation of the Holy See to the Ecumenical Patriarchate in Constantinople for the Feast of St Andrew the Apostle. In August 2007, he led the Catholic delegation to the funeral of Patriarch Teoctist of the Romanian Orthodox Church.

=== Society of Saint Pius X ===
In January 2009, Kasper told The New York Times that he had little, if any, input on whether to lift the excommunication of four bishops of the Society of Saint Pius X. Kasper was distancing himself from the scandal that ensued when it transpired that one of the bishops, Richard Williamson, was found to have claimed that reports about The Holocaust were exaggerated and that no Jews died in Nazi gas chambers. As the Vatican official responsible for relations with the Jewish religion, Kasper felt it necessary to comment on the action and the process leading up to the lifting of the excommunications. He said that: "Up to now people in the Vatican have spoken too little with each other and have not checked where problems might arise." He said that in lifting the excommunications "there were misunderstandings and management errors in the Curia."

=== Comments on Britain ===
In September 2010, Kasper withdrew from the papal visit to Great Britain, after reportedly saying that Heathrow Airport gives the impression of a Third World country and that the United Kingdom is marked by "a new and aggressive atheism". In an interview with a German magazine, he was quoted as saying: "When you land at Heathrow you think at times you have landed in a Third World country". Kasper's secretary explained it as "a description of the many different people that live in Britain at the moment". He said that when one wears a cross on the British Airways "you are discriminated against", a reference to the British Airways cross controversy. British Airways said that Kasper had been "seriously misinformed" in his claims about the airline, and that "It is completely untrue that we discriminate against Christians or members of any faith".

A spokesman for the Church in Britain said that Kasper's remarks were not the views of the Vatican or of the Church. The cardinal's secretary said that Kasper had decided not to travel because gout made it difficult for him to walk. He also explained the cardinal used "aggressive atheism" to describe people like Richard Dawkins, a prominent atheist, who have been very critical of the Pope and talked about making a "citizens arrest" of the Pope while in Britain.

=== Criticism of the Church of England and the Anglican Communion ===
Kasper has criticized the Church of England policies in relation to female priests and the elevation of women to the episcopate. He expressed his views in the address given to the Church of England Bishops' Meeting at 5 June 2006. He said that the ordination of women as bishops would "call into question what was recognized by the Second Vatican Council (Unitatis Redintegratio, 13), that the Anglican Communion occupied 'a special place' among churches and ecclesial communities of the West." He warned that the "restoration of full Church communion ... would realistically no longer exist following the introduction of the ordination of women to episcopal office." He spoke at the 2008 Lambeth Conference, criticizing the departures from Christian orthodoxy taken on women clergy and episcopate and even more by some member churches of the Anglican Communion on allowing the blessing of same-sex unions and non-celibate homosexual clergy. He called at the occasion for a new Oxford Movement to rise among Anglicanism.

=== Pope Francis ===
Pope Francis, on 17 March 2013, four days after his election as Pope, called Kasper "a clever theologian, a good theologian", in the course of a sermon in which he reported that Kasper's book on mercy "did me a lot of good".

=== Proposal of admission at communion of remarried couples ===
Kasper proposed to admit to Communion Catholic couples who have remarried outside of the Church while still being canonically married to a prior spouse according to Catholic doctrine. On 21 February 2014, Kasper said at a consistory in Rome that:

"The Church cannot question the words of Jesus on the indissolubility of marriage. Whoever expects the Consistory and the Synod to come up with 'easy', general solutions that apply to everyone, are mistaken. But given the difficulties which families today face and the huge rise in the number of failed marriages, new paths can be explored in order to respond to the deep needs of divorced people who have remarried as part of a civil union, who recognise their failure, convert and after a period of penance ask to be re-admitted to the sacraments."

The proposal was met with hostility by some traditional cardinals, including Gerhard Müller, Raymond Burke, Walter Brandmüller, Carlo Caffarra and Velasio De Paolis, who co-authored the book Remaining in the Truth of Christ: Marriage and Communion in the Catholic Church, released in English in October 2014, to refute Kasper's proposal. Kasper later stated that he did not have Pope Francis' support on his proposal. He praised Francis' 2016 apostolic exhortation Amoris Laetitia, saying that the correct interpretation is that it allows the admission of divorced and remarried people to communion in some individual cases.

=== 2014 General Synod ===
During the Third Extraordinary General Assembly of the Synod of Bishops in 2014, Kasper told reporters that since African, Asian, and Middle Eastern countries have a "taboo" against homosexuality, "they should not tell us too much what we have to do." Once the story broke, he denied that he made any such comment. The reporter who wrote the story, Edward Pentin, subsequently produced a recording of the conversation, which verified that the Cardinal had made those statements. Cardinal Raymond Burke called Kasper's remarks "profoundly sad and scandalous". Kasper subsequently confirmed that he had had the conversation, and offered this response for one of his remarks:

If one of my remarks about Africans was perceived as demeaning or insulting, then I am honestly sorry. That was and is not my intention, and not my view at all. No one will deny that Africa's culture is different from Europe's in many respects. But I have been in Africa too often not to esteem African culture highly.

Kasper also said parts of the Catholic media were engaged in a "deliberate dirty tricks" campaign against him, and said that "The fact that Catholic media (and unfortunately a cardinal in person) should participate in it, in order to tear down another position morally, is shameful."

=== On Jesus Christ ===
In his book The God of Jesus Christ, Kasper concluded that what Jesus effected was to give suffering "eternal import, the import of love." Kasper points out that Gregory of Nyssa and Augustine of Hippo, working out of the New Testament, speak of a God who can freely choose to feel compassion, which implies suffering. Kasper adds that: "It is Origen who gave us the clearest statement. In Origen's words: 'First God suffered, then he came down. What was the suffering he accepted for us? The suffering of love.' Origen adds that it is not just the Son but also the Father who suffers so. This is made possible by God's freedom in love."

Kasper's book Jesus the Christ (1974) treats Christology in three manners: a contemporary approach, a historical approach and a factual approach. After these three approaches have been exhausted, the Christological themes of resurrection, mystery, and priesthood are treated. Ecclesiology is seen as part of Christology in this book because the Church is oriented towards Christ in his person, since Christ did not only say things, but he also did things.

== Works ==
- — (1965). Das Absolute in der Geschichte. Philosophie und Theologie der Geschichte in der Spätphilosophie Schellings [The Absolute in history: Philosophy and theology of history in Schelling's late philosophy] (in German).
- — (1970). Glaube und Geschichte [Faith and history] (in German).
- — (1972). Einführung in den Glauben [Introduction to the faith] (in German).
- — (1974). Jesus der Christus [Jesus the Christ] (in German).
- — (1977). Zur Theologie der Christlichen Ehe [The theology of Christian marriage] (in German).
- — (1982). Der Gott Jesu Christi [The God of Jesus Christ] (in German).
- — (1995). Leben aus den Glauben [Life from the faith] (in German).
- — (1987). Theologie und Kirche [Theology and church] (in German). Vol. 1.
- — (1999). Theologie und Kirche [Theology and church] (in German). Vol. 2.
- — (2003). Leadership in the Church [Leadership in the church] (in German).
- — (2004). Sakrament der Einheit. Eucharistie und Kirche [Sacrament of unity: Eucharist and church] (in German).
- — (2005). Wege in die Einheit. Perspektiven für die Ökumene [Paths to unity: Perspectives for ecumenism] (in German).
- with Deckers, Daniel (2008). Wo das Herz des Glaubens schlägt. Die Erfharung eines Leben [Where the heart of faith beats: The Experience of a life] (in German).
- — (2011). Katolische Kirche: Wesen - Wirklichkeit - Sendung [Catholic Church: Being, reality, transmission] (in German).
- — (2012). Barmherzigkeit: Grundbegriff des Evangeliums - Schlüssel christlichen Lebens [Mercy: Central concept of the gospel, key to Christian life] (in German).
- — (2014). Das Evangelium von der Familie. Die Rede vor dem Konsistorium [The gospel of the family. The speech at the consistory] (in German).
- — (2015). Papst Franziskus - Revolution der Zärtlichkeit und der Liebe [Pope Francis: Revolution of tenderness and love] (in German).
- — (2018). Die Botschaft von Amoris Laetitia. Ein freundlicher Disput [The message of Amoris Laetitia: A friendly dispute] (in German).

Catholic Church titles
Preceded by Georg Moser	Bishop of Rottenburg-Stuttgart; 4 April 1989 – 31 May 1999	Succeeded by Gebhard Fürst
Preceded by Pierre François Marie Joseph Duprey	Secretary of the Pontifical Council for Promoting Christian Unity; 16 March 1999 – 21 February 2001	Succeeded by Marc Ouellet
Preceded by Alberto Bovone	Cardinal Deacon of Ognissanti in Via Appia Nuova; 21 February 2001 – 21 February 2011	Himself as Cardinal Priest
Preceded by Edward Idris Cassidy	President of the Pontifical Council for Promoting Christian Unity; 3 March 2001 – 1 July 2010	Succeeded by Kurt Koch
Preceded by Edward Idris Cassidy	President of the Commission for Religious Relations with the Jews; 3 March 2001 – 1 July 2010	Succeeded by Kurt Koch
Himself as Cardinal Deacon	Cardinal Priest 'pro hac vice' of Ognissanti in Via Appia Nuova; 21 February 2011 –	Incumbent
