= Joint Commission of the Theological Dialogue Between the Orthodox Church and the Oriental Orthodox Churches =

Eastern & Oriental Orthodox ecumenical dialogue

The Joint Commission of the Theological Dialogue Between the Orthodox Church and the Oriental Orthodox Churches are a series of ecumenical dialogues between the Eastern Orthodox churches and Oriental Orthodox Churches. The division between the churches can be traced to the years following the Council of Chalcedon (451) whose Christological teaching the Oriental Orthodox did not accept. Attempts to mend the subsequent schism "were abandoned in the mid-sixth century" and remained dormant until these meetings and dialogues in the mid- to late-20th century.

The joint commission believes both churches share the same Christological beliefs in substance, the differences being semantic in nature, and that the schism can be mended.

== History ==
=== Council of Chalcedon ===
The Council of Chalcedon (convened in the city of Chalcedon, Bithynia; modern-day Kadıköy, Istanbul, Turkey), was the fourth ecumenical council of the Christian Church. It was convoked by the Roman emperor Marcian and took place from 8 October to 1 November 451. The principal purpose of the council was to re-assert the ecumenical Council of Ephesus' teachings of Christ's nature as simultaneously divine and human, opposing the teachings of Eutyches (of Christ as solely divine: Monophysitism) and Nestorius (of Christ being divine and human separately: Nestorianism).

Christological spectrum during the 5th–7th centuries, showing the Monophysite position on the extreme right and the Nestorian position on the extreme left

The council adopted the confession of Dyophysitism: that Jesus Christ is one person of one substance and one hypostasis, with two distinct but inseparable natures. As well as opposing Monophysitism, this opposed Miaphysitism (divine and human but in one nature). Those who held to Miaphysitism accused the Dyophysites of embracing Nestorianism and broke off from the rest of the church to become what is now the Oriental Orthodox Churches.

=== Ecumenism ===
In the 20th century, the Eastern Orthodox and Oriental Orthodox Churches, "through the efforts of the Faith and Order Commission of the World Council of Churches", began entering into ecumenical dialogue to explore the potential of the schism being mended. This began with four unofficial meetings, followed by four official dialogues.

== Unofficial meetings ==
Four unofficial meetings between clergy and theologians of the Eastern and Oriental Orthodox churches took place.

=== Aarhus (1964) ===
The first unofficial meeting took place in Aarhus, Denmark from August 11 to August 15, 1964. Consultations were held between representatives of the Eastern Orthodox and Oriental Orthodox churches on the sidelines of a meeting of the Faith and Order Commission. At these consultations, it became increasingly clear that the differences between the Oriental Orthodox and Eastern Orthodox positions on Christology and the nature of the Incarnation were not irreconcilable in themselves, but the attendant history of anathemas and counter-anathemas would be an obstacle toward true communion between the schismed churches.

On the essence of the Christological dogma we found ourselves in full agreement. Through the different terminologies used by each side, we saw the same truth expressed. Since we agree in rejecting without reservation the teaching of Eutyches as well as of Nestorius, the acceptance or non-acceptance of the Council of Chalcedon does not entail the acceptance of either heresy. Both sides found themselves fundamentally following the Christological teaching of the one undivided Church as expressed by St. Cyril.

These consultations included the following participants.

Name	Institution or location	Jurisdiction	Sect
Bishop Emilianos (Timiadis)	World Council of Churches, Geneva, Switzerland	Ecumenical Patriarchate of Constantinople	Chalcedonian
G. Florovsky	Princeton University, Princeton, NJ, US	Greek Orthodox Archdiocese of North and South America, Ecumenical Patriarchate of Constantinople	Chalcedonian
J. S. Romanides	Holy Cross Greek Orthodox Theological School, Brookline, MA, US	Greek Orthodox Archdiocese of North and South America, Ecumenical Patriarchate of Constantinople	Chalcedonian
Vitaly Borovoy	World Council of Churches, Geneva	Russian Orthodox Church	Chalcedonian
J. Meyendorff	St. Vladimir's Orthodox Seminary, Tuckahoe, NY, US	Russian Orthodox Greek Catholic Church of North America	Chalcedonian
J. N. Karmiris	University of Athens, Athens, Greece	Church of Greece	Chalcedonian
G. Konidaris	University of Athens, Athens, Greece	Church of Greece	Chalcedonian
Archbishop Tiran Nersoyan	St. Nersess Armenian Theological School, Evanston IL	Armenian Apostolic Church	Non-Chalcedonian
Bishop Karekin Sarkissian	Armenian Theological Seminary, Antelias, Lebanon	Armenian Apostolic Church, Catholicosate of Cilicia	Non-Chalcedonian
Archbishop Mar Severius Zakka Iwas	Mosul, Iraq	Syrian Orthodox Church	Non-Chalcedonian
Metropolitan Mar Thoma Dionysius	Mount Tabor Monastery, Pathanapuram, Kerala, India	Orthodox Syrian Church of the East	Non-Chalcedonian
Father N. J. Thomas	Mount Tabor Monastery, Pathanapuram, Kerala, India	Orthodox Syrian Church of the East	Non-Chalcedonian
Habte Mariam Worqineh	Cathedral of the Holy Trinity, Addis Ababa, Ethiopia	Ethiopian Orthodox Church	Non-Chalcedonian
V.C. Samuel	Theological College, Addis Ababa, Ethiopia	Orthodox Syrian Church of the East	Non-Chalcedonian
Karam Nazir Khella	Philosophische Fakultät Hamburg; Theological Faculty Cairo	Coptic Orthodox Church	Non-Chalcedonian
Getachew Haile	Haile Selassie I University, Addis Ababa, Ethiopia	Ethiopian Orthodox Church	Non-Chalcedonian

=== Bristol (1967) ===
The second unofficial meeting took place three years later in 1967, in Bristol, England. Like the Aarhus meeting, the location was one of convenience as the Secretariat of the Commission on Faith and Order was already taking place; this allowed the participation of many Orthodox delegates who would have otherwise been unable to attend. The meeting was received with general positively, with the suggestion of a third meeting in Geneva before the summer of 1969. The participants agreed on the following topics of further discussion for the future meeting:

1. An evaluation of the objections raised against the Council of Chalcedon by non-Chalcedonians during the period 451 to 681 A.D.
2. An examination of the causes for the failure of the many reunion efforts from 433 to 681 to achieve the unity of Christological faith and therefore the unity of the Christian Church.
3. An examination of the doctrine of God as well as soteriological, ecclesiological and anthropological presuppositions in the Christological dispute.
4. A historical analysis of the rise of terminology in the 5th century — especially in relation to the following terms:
  1. physis, hypostasis, ousia
  2. natura, persona, essentia, substantia
  3. homoousion and consubstantial
  4. the four Christological adverbs
5. The procedure for acceptance or non-acceptance of a council, and a comparative study of the acceptance or non-acceptance of the Councils of Nicea (325) and Chalcedon (451) in Chalcedonian as well as non-Chalcedonian churches.
6. A historical study of procedures used by the Roman Catholic Church to accept into their communion both Chalcedonian and non-Chalcedonian groups. (Conditions for formation of uniate orthodox groups.)
7. Authority of the Ecumenical Councils for faith and life. The question of the formal acceptance of a council versus the acceptance of its teaching — both in doctrinal and canonical decisions.
8. Continuity of Sacramental teaching in the Eastern Orthodox and Oriental Orthodox churches — their divergences if any.
9. Further elucidation of what is involved in the debate between one united will and energy and two inseparable wills and energies.
10. A historical analysis of the background of the Council of Chalcedon, evaluating the role of:
  1. cultural tensions within the Empire, and
  2. the Imperial power in determining or guiding the decisions of the Council.
11. A study of comparative ecclesiology — with particular reference to the question of seven councils versus three councils.
12. An examination of the problem of doctors and saints of one side being anathematized by the other.

=== Geneva (1970) ===
A further three years passed until the third unofficial meeting in 1970, located in Geneva, Switzerland.

=== Addis Ababa (1971) ===
The last of the unofficial meetings was held in Addis Ababa, Ethiopia in 1971

== Official dialogues ==
The unofficial meetings led to a series of four official dialogues between the two churches.

=== Geneva (1985) ===
The first official dialogue took place on 15 December 1985 in Geneva, Switzerland.

It culminated in a joint communique by Professor Dr. Chrysostomos Konstantinidis (Metropolitan of Myra, Ecumenical Patriarchate) and Bishop Bishoy (Coptic Orthodox Church):

"...For the next meetings, whose aim would be to rediscover our common grounds in Christology and ecclesiology, the following main theme and subsequent sub-themes were agreed upon: Towards a Common Christology

1. Problems of terminology;
2. 'Conciliar formulations;
3. Historical factors;
4. Interpretation of Christological dogmas today..."

=== First Agreed Statement, Egypt (1989) ===
The second official dialogue was held on 24 June 1989, this time in Wadi El-Natrun, Egypt. This was the occasion for the signing of the First Agreed Statement, at which participants affirmed the fundamental commonalities between the Dyophysite and Miaphysite positions.

Both sides found common ground in their rejection of the two extremes of the classical Christological debate, i.e., the strict Alexandrine, or Monophysite, position which holds that Christ has only a divine nature, as well as the strict Antiochene position which upholds a radical separation of Christ's divine and human natures. The agreed theological statement therefore explicitly rejects both the Nestorian heresy ("We neither separate nor divide the human nature in Christ from His divine nature") and the Eutychian or Monophysite heresy ("nor do we think that [the human nature] was absorbed in [the divine nature] and thus [the former] ceased to exist"). In this middle ground, the statement asserted that

We neither separate nor divide the human nature in Christ from His divine nature, nor do we think that the former was absorbed in the latter and thus ceased to exist. The four adverbs used to qualify the mystery of the hypostatic union belong to our common tradition – without commingling (or confusion), without change, without separation and without division. Those among us who speak of two natures in Christ do not thereby deny their inseparable, indivisible union; those among us who speak of one united divine-human nature in Christ do not thereby deny the continuing dynamic presence in Christ of the divine and the human, without change, without confusion.

The participants appear to have found this common ground by referring to the writings of Cyril of Alexandria, who is venerated by Chalcedonians and non-Chalcedonians alike. Since Cyril used the formula "mia physis ton Theou Logon sesarkomene" (the one physis or hypostasis of God's Word Incarnate), the agreed statement suggests that while monophysitism is beyond the pale of Nicene Christianity, miaphysitism is not.

=== Second Agreed Statement, Geneva (1990) ===
Returning to Geneva, the third official dialogue was held on 28 September 1990. This was the occasion for the Second Agreed Statement. This clarified and interpreted the first statement, with particular reference to pastoral matters, anathemas, and the acceptance (or lack thereof) of the last four ecumenical councils.

The second statement also explicitly stated the validity of both the Oriental Orthodox terminology of the Incarnation ("one nature of the incarnate Logos") and the Eastern Orthodox terminology (two natures in Christ that are distinct "in thought alone"). Thus, no changes to the terminology used by either side were proposed, and the participants of the commission stated:

we have now clearly understood that both families have always loyally maintained the same authentic Orthodox Christological faith, and the unbroken continuity of the apostolic tradition, though they have used Christological terms in different ways

While both sides agree that the underlying causes of the schism --- ostensibly Christological --- have been thus addressed, the commission did not come to a definitive agreement about the latter four ecumenical councils, which continued to be a stumbling block for the reconciliation of the two sides.

Both families accept the first three Ecumenical Councils, which form our common heritage. In relation to the four later Councils of the Orthodox Church, the Orthodox state that for them the above points [i.e., the points made in the Second Agreed Statement] are the teachings also of the four later Councils of the Orthodox Church, while the Oriental Orthodox consider this statement of the Orthodox as their interpretation. With this understanding, the Oriental Orthodox respond to it positively.

Both sides agreed in principle that they "should" lift all anathemas against Councils and Fathers of the other side, but no concrete steps were taken in this regard:

"The manner in which the anathemas are to be lifted should be decided by the Churches individually... we submit this Agreed Statement and Recommendations to our venerable Churches for their consideration and action."

=== Geneva (1993) ===
The last of the four official dialogues was held on 6 November 1993, returning again to Geneva.

Proposals for Lifting Anathemas was published.

== After 1993 ==
The Joint Commission of the two families of Orthodoxy has not convened since 1993, with the churches being left to decide the next steps to be taken. For many years, little has happened, but many sought concrete steps to reach full communion.

On March 10–13, 2005, the Inter-Orthodox Theological Committee for Dialogue between the Eastern Orthodox Church and the Oriental Orthodox Churches was held in Chambésy, Geneva. This meeting sought to acknowledge the progress that had been made, and the opportunities and challenges for the ecumenical work going forward.

The International Orthodox Theological Association (IOTA) (registered in 2017 as a non-profit organization in Illinois, USA) aims to support pan-Orthodox unity and conciliarity, and maintain constructive relations with the leaders of all Eastern Orthodox and Oriental Orthodox churches. The organization has hosted international conferences since 2019, and facilitates group research projects.

== Current ecumenical status ==
The following table lists the positions of the autocephalous Orthodox churches regarding the joint commission's statements and proposals. Autonomous churches have been listed when their stances differ from their parent autocephalous church.

=== Eastern Orthodox churches ===
==== In agreement ====
- Alexandria
- Antioch
- Romania
- Serbia

==== Participating ====
- Constantinople
- Cyprus
- Greece
- Jerusalem
- Russia

==== Not participating ====
- Albania
- Bulgaria
- Czech Republic & Slovakia
- Georgia
- Macedonia
- Poland

=== Oriental Orthodox Churches ===
==== In agreement ====
- Alexandria
- Antioch
- Malankara-India

==== Participating ====
- Armenia
- Cilicia

==== Not participating ====
- Ethiopia
- Eritrea

==== In opposition ====
(none)

== See also ==
- Chalcedonian Schism
- Eastern Orthodoxy
- Ecumenism
- Joint International Commission for Theological Dialogue between the Catholic Church and the Oriental Orthodox Churches
- Joint International Commission for Theological Dialogue Between the Catholic Church and the Orthodox Church
- Oriental Orthodoxy
