= Georg Moser =

German Catholic Bishop

- Bishop of Rottenburg-Stuttgart
- Church: Catholic Church
- Diocese: Diocese of Rottenburg-Stuttgart
- In office: 12 March 1975 – 9 May 1988
- Predecessor: Carl Joseph Leiprecht
- Successor: Walter Kasper
- Previous posts: Titular Bishop of Thiges (1970-1975); Auxiliary Bishop of Rottenburg (1970-1975)

Orders
- Ordination: 19 March 1948
- Consecration: 14 November 1970 by Carl Joseph Leiprecht

Personal details
- Born: 10 June 1923 Leutkirch, Free People's State of Württemberg, German Reich
- Died: 9 May 1988 (aged 64) Stuttgart, Baden-Württemberg, West Germany
- Coat of arms

Georg Moser (10 June 1923 – 9 May 1988) was a German Catholic Bishop. He was the Bishop of Rottenburg-Stuttgart.

== Biography ==
Moser was born in Leutkirch in the Allgäu. He studied theology at the University of Tübingen from 1942 to 1947. He entered the priesthood in 1948. Moser earned his doctorate at the same university in 1962.

On 14 November 1970 he was consecrated bishop in Stuttgart, and on 25 February 1975 he became Bishop of Rottenburg (in 1978 the diocese was renamed Rottenburg-Stuttgart). During his time as bishop, he started the 'Johann Sebastian Drey Foundation' and the 'Family Living Space' foundation.

Moser died in Stuttgart at the age of 65 after a long, difficult illness.

== Awards ==
Moser was given several awards including;

- Papal Privy Chamberlain (1965)
- Grand Cross of the Order of Merit of the Order of Malta (1983)
- Media Prize of the Southern German Order of Malta (1989)

== Publications ==
- Der Jahre gewinn, lebensbetrachtungen (1973)
- China's Katholiken suchen neue Wege (contributor)
- Stille im Lärm, meditationen und anregungen (1981)
- Was die Welt verändert (1988)

Preceded by Carl Joseph Leiprecht	Bishop of Rottenburg; 1975—1978	Succeeded by —
Preceded by —	Bishop of Rottenburg-Stuttgart; 1978—1988	Succeeded by Walter Kasper
