= Abitinae =

Archaeological site in Tunisia

Africa Proconsularis

Abitinae was a town in the Roman province of Africa Proconsularis and is famed for the Martyrs of Abitinae.

== Bishopric ==
Extant contemporary records give the names of several bishops of the bishopric of Abitinae. Saturninus was at the Council of Carthage (256), called by Cyprian to consider the question of the lapsi. Fundanus was the bishop who apostasized in the persecution of Diocletian and whose name is linked with the account of the Martyrs of Abitinae. At the joint Council of Carthage (411) between Catholic and Donatist bishops, Abitinae was represented by the Catholic Victor and the Donatist Maximus. Gaudiosus was one of the Catholic bishops whom the Arian Vandal king Genseric exiled; he died in 453 in Naples. Reparatus and Augustalis took part in the Council of Carthage (525) and the Council of Carthage (646), respectively.

No longer a residential diocese, Abitinae is today listed by the Catholic Church as a titular see.

== See also ==
- List of Catholic titular sees
