= Subbotniki =

Subbotniki Субботники
- Settlement
- Location within Perm Krai Location within Russia
- Coordinates: 58°01′N 54°36′E
- Country: Russia
- Region: Perm Krai
- District: Vereshchaginsky District
- Time zone: UTC+5:00 (CET)

Subbotniki (Russian: Субботники) is a rural locality (a settlement) in Vereshchaginskoye Urban Settlement, Vereshchaginsky District, Perm Krai, Russia. The population was 400 as of 2010.

== Geography ==
It is located 6 km (3.7 mi) south-west from Vereshchagino.
