= Carl Joseph Leiprecht =

- Bishop of Rottenburg
- Church: Catholic Church
- Diocese: Diocese of Rottenburg
- In office: 4 July 1949 – 4 June 1974
- Predecessor: Joannes Baptista Sproll
- Successor: Georg Moser
- Previous posts: Titular Bishop of Scyros (1948-1949); Auxiliary Bishop of Rottenburg (1948-1949)

Orders
- Ordination: 24 March 1928
- Consecration: 30 November 1948 by Wendelin Rauch

Personal details
- Born: 11 September 1903 Hauerz, Bad Wurzach, Kingdom of Württemberg, German Empire
- Died: 29 October 1981 (aged 78) Ravensburg, Baden-Württemberg, West Germany
- Coat of arms

Karl Joseph Leiprecht (11 September 1903 – 29 October 1981) was the Bishop of Rottenburg.

Born in the town of Hauerz (now Bad Wurzach) in the Allgäu, Leiprecht studied philosophy and theology at the University of Tübingen from 1923 to 1927. On 24 March 1928 he was ordained a priest by Bishop Johannes Baptista Sproll at Rottenburg Cathedral. Over the next five years, he served as a vicar at Holy Cross Minster in Schwäbisch Gmünd and at St. George's Church in Stuttgart.

Leiprecht served as the city priest of Rottweil from 1942 to 1947 before becoming vicar capitular at Rottenburg Cathedral. On 7 October 1948 he was named Titular Bishop of Scyrus and Auxiliary Bishop of Rottenburg; he was consecrated bishop on November 30 by Archbishop Wendelin Rauch at Rottenburg Cathedral. The next year, Leiprecht was elected the Bishop of Rottenburg on 21 June, Pius XII officially named him to the post on 4 July and he was enthroned on 8 September. He played a significant role in the diocese's reorganization and reconstruction in the post-war period.

Leiprecht was one of the youngest theologians at the Second Vatican Council to be nominated by Pope John XXIII.

He resigned from the office of bishop on 4 June 1974 and died in 1981 in Ravensburg.

Preceded by Johannes Baptista Sproll	Bishop of Rottenburg; 1949—1974	Succeeded by Georg Moser
