= Commission for Religious Relations with the Jews =

Pontifical commission in the Roman Curia

The Commission for Religious Relations with the Jews is a pontifical commission in the Roman Curia tasked with maintaining positive theological ties with Jews and Judaism. Established on 22 October 1974, it is affiliated with the Dicastery for Promoting Christian Unity.

== Description ==
Its current president is Kurt Koch, who holds that position ex officio as Cardinal Prefect of the Dicastery for Promoting Christian Unity. The vice-president is the secretary of the Dicastery, Flavio Pace.

The Commission has published a series of documents on Christian–Jewish reconciliation :

- Guidelines and Suggestions for Implementing the Conciliar Declaration Nostra aetate (No. 4) (1974)
- Notes on the Correct Way to Present Jews and Judaism in Preaching and Teaching in the Roman Catholic Church (1985)
- On 10 December 2015, it published 'The Gifts and the Calling of God Are Irrevocable' (Rom 11:29): A Reflection on Theological Questions Pertaining to Catholic–Jewish Relations on the Occasion of the 50th Anniversary of Nostra aetate (no. 4).

There is a similar Commission for Religious Relations with Muslims, which is part of the Dicastery for Interreligious Dialogue.

== See also ==
- Catholic resistance to Nazi Germany
- Index of Vatican City-related articles
- International Catholic-Jewish Historical Commission
- Nazi persecution of the Catholic Church
- Papal Jews
- Pope Benedict XV and Judaism
- Pope Benedict XVI and Judaism
- Pope Francis and Judaism
- Pope John Paul II and Judaism
- Pope Pius XII and the Holocaust
- Relations between Catholicism and Judaism
- Rescue of Jews by Catholics during the Holocaust
