= Wilhelm Berning =

German Catholic bishop of Osnabrück

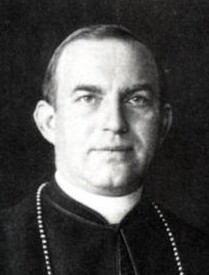
- Wilhelm Berning, before 1920

Bishop of Osnabrück
- In office 29 September 1914 – 23 November 1955
- Preceded by: Hubertus Voß
- Succeeded by: Franziskus Demann

Vicar Apostolic Apostolic Vicariate of Northern Germany
- In office 15 September 1914 – 13 August 1930
- Preceded by: Hubertus Voß
- Succeeded by: Position abolished

Apostolic Prefect Schleswig-Holstein
- In office 15 September 1914 – 13 August 1930
- Preceded by: Hubertus Voß
- Succeeded by: Position abolished

Personal details
- Born: 26 March 1877 Lingen, Province of Hanover, Kingdom of Prussia, German Empire
- Died: 23 November 1955 (aged 78) Osnabrück, Lower Saxony, West Germany
- Cause of death: Heart attack
- Resting place: St. Peter's Cathedral, Osnabrück
- Party: Center Party
- Education: University of Münster; University of Breslau
- Profession: Clergyman

Hermann Wilhelm Berning (26 March 1877 – 23 November 1955) was the Roman Catholic Bishop of Osnabrück from 1914 to his death in 1955. Politically, he was a conservative and a German nationalist and his attitude toward the Nazi regime is a matter of controversy among historians.

== Early life and education ==
Berning was born in Lingen, the son of a master carpenter. He obtained his Abitur at the local Gymnasium in 1895. He then studied philosophy, Catholic theology and history at the University of Münster and the University of Breslau (today, the University of Wrocław) between 1895 and 1899. As a student, he was an active member of the Catholic student associations Germania Münster and Unitas Breslau. He entered the priesthood on 10 March 1900, receiving holy orders in St. Peter's Cathedral, Osnabrück. In March 1901, he obtained his Doctor of Theology in Münster. He passed the senior teacher examination and became a senior teacher and rector at the Windthorst Gymnasium in Meppen from 1901 to 1909. He next advanced to the position of head of the pedagogical course for teacher training in Haselünne from 1909 to 1914.

== Career as Bishop of Osnabrück ==
=== Through the Weimar Republic ===
Berning was elected Bishop of Osnabrück by the cathedral chapter on 26 May 1914 and he was formally appointed to this position by Pope Pius X on 7 July. Bishop Adolf Bertram of Hildesheim officiated at the ordination ceremony on 29 September 1914 at the cathedral in Osnabrück. On 15 September 1914, Berning additionally was appointed acting Vicar Apostolic for the Apostolic Vicariate of Northern Germany and acting Apostolic Prefect of Schleswig-Holstein, positions that were made permanent on 22 November 1921. On 13 August 1930, Berning's diocese of Osnabrück was significantly expanded to include the Apostolic Vicariate and the Apostolic Prefecture, both of which had previously been subordinated to him only in personal union. In 1931 he was granted the title of Assistant to the Papal Throne.

Throughout the Weimar Republic, Berning, along with the other German bishops, was a strong supporter of the socially-conservative German Center Party, sometimes called the Catholic Center Party, which was closely associated with the Catholic Church and headed by Catholic Monsignor Ludwig Kaas from December 1928. In 1932, the Center Party supported the election of Paul von Hindenburg over Adolf Hitler as Reich President.

=== Under the Third Reich ===
After the Nazi seizure of power in January 1933, in seeking to preserve the unprecedented gains that Catholics had made in the government and in senior civil service positions under the Republic, Berning and many other German bishops were initially supportive of the new regime. This support was intensified when the government announced its intention to reach a concordat with the Vatican that was widely expected would protect the rights of German Catholics. In addition, the bishops were fully supportive of Hitler's well-known opposition to Communism. The bishops reversed their previous opposition to Nazism and issued a collective declaration of support for the regime in May.

Berning's support is revealed in a series of quotes attributed to him. At a meeting with Hitler on 26 April 1933, he expressed the belief that "Morality is being raised and the fight against Bolshevism and godlessness is being waged." On 11 July 1933, Prussian Minister president Hermann Göring appointed Berning to the recently reconstituted Prussian State Council, where he would continue to serve until the fall of the Nazi regime in May 1945. Berning then announced in a press release: "The German bishops have long since approved the new state … With this in mind, I will leave no stone unturned in order not to give proof of my loyalty to the new state with words alone." In September 1933 he said at the Katholikentag in Bremen: "In our holy Catholic Church we have already received the Führerprinzip from the founder of our church, Jesus Christ." At the time of the plebiscite called to ratify Hitler as Hindenburg's successor as head of state, Berning declared on 18 August 1934: "I consider it the self-evident duty of every German, for the sake of the solidarity and unity of the German people, to answer a joyous 'Yes' to the question of the Führer."

Coat of arms of Hermann Wilhelm Berning.

In the face of increasing Nazi intimidation against all opposition parties, the Center Party dissolved itself on 5 July 1933. The Reichskonkordat between the Reich government and the Vatican was signed on 20 July 1933 and ratified on 10 September. In exchange for the withdrawal of the Church from an active role in politics, the agreement promised freedom of religion and protection for Catholic lay organizations. Yet almost immediately, the Nazis began violating the terms of the pact by suppressing Catholic social, union and youth organizations, interfering with Catholic education and confiscating Church property. Within days of the signing, the first steps were taken to dissolve the Catholic Youth League and scores of Catholic publications were suppressed. Erich Klausener, the leader of Catholic Action in Berlin, and Adalbert Probst, the national director of the Catholic Youth Sports Association were murdered in the Night of the Long Knives. Over the next years, thousands of priests, nuns and lay leaders were arrested, many on trumped-up charges of immorality or smuggling foreign currency.

In the face of this mounting persecution, disillusionment with the regime began to set in among the Catholic leadership. However, as late as August 1940, at the German Bishops Conference held in Fulda, Berning was described as being one of the "outstanding speakers" and "the foremost exponent of rapprochement between the Church and State". Reports indicated that he had repeatedly stated his conviction that the Church should abandon any opposition to the Nazi regime, and that his influence appeared to be in the ascendant. A pastoral letter by the bishops was widely expected to reorient the Church's relation to the government along these lines. However, in the end, the Vatican refused to release the pastoral letter. As the persecution and concentration camp imprisonment of Catholic priests became more widespread, Berning began to be increasingly critical of the regime in sermons in Osnabrück Cathedral, though he was never as vociferous and persistent a critic as his fellow bishops Clemens August Graf von Galen of Münster and Konrad von Preysing of Berlin.

The Nazi government instituted a policy of involuntary euthanasia for mentally ill, physically deformed, and incurably sick individuals in October 1939 that became known as Aktion T4. In a decree issued on 2 December 1940, the Vatican denounced this policy as contrary to both natural and divine law. Despite this, the German Church hierarchy decided that further specific action on their part was inadvisable. However, in a sermon on 8 June 1941 in Rulle, a small village in the municipality of Wallenhorst, Berning became one of the first high church officials in Germany to publicly oppose the regime's euthanasia program, when he protested that "the protection of human life" was no longer being safeguarded. Though little noticed and not very effective, his action took place even a bit earlier than Bishop von Galen's more famous and more widely circulated sermon of 3 August 1941 on this subject, which contributed to a suspension of the program in late August.

As a Prussian State Councilor, Berning negotiated often, but mostly unsuccessfully, with the Reich government to intervene on behalf of individuals, including the former Social Democratic Reichstag member Julius Leber. He also visited several clergy members from his diocese who had been imprisoned, the so-called Lübeck Martyrs, and wrote a plea for clemency, which was rejected.

Regarding Bishop Berning's attitude toward the persecution of the Jews, he was present as the representative of the German Bishops' Conference at a meeting with Hitler on 26 April 1933. The notes of the meeting do not record any response by Berning after Hitler made the following declaration:

I have been attacked because of my handling of the Jewish question. The Catholic Church considered the Jews pestilent for fifteen hundred years, put them in ghettos, etc, because it recognized the Jews for what they were. In the epoch of liberalism the danger was no longer recognized. I am moving back toward the time in which a fifteen-hundred-year-long tradition was implemented. I do not set race over religion, but I recognize the representatives of this race as pestilent for the state and for the church and perhaps I am thereby doing Christianity a great service by pushing them out of schools and public functions.

With regard to the Holocaust, according to historian Michael Phayer, some German bishops succeeded very early on in discovering that the Nazis were murdering Jews in occupied Poland, and Berning knew about the systematic nature of the Holocaust as early as February 1942, only one month after the Wannsee Conference. Most German Church historians believe that the majority of the church leaders knew of the Holocaust by the end of 1942. Despite this, there is no record of Berning publicly speaking out on this issue.

=== Post-war years ===
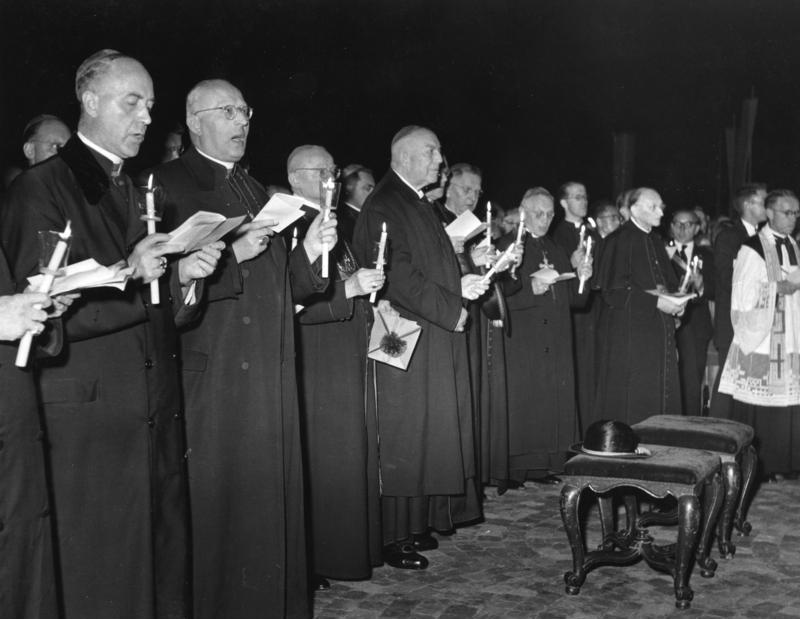
Archbishop Berning (First row, 4th from left) at the Katholikentag in Fulda, 5 September 1954

Following the end of the Second World War and the fall of the Nazi regime, Berning continued in his position as bishop and did not comment on his role under the Third Reich. In the post-war period, Berning campaigned for the integration of those German refugees who fled or were expelled from the former eastern territories of Germany ceded to Poland and the Soviet Union. On 10 March 1950, Pope Pius XII bestowed upon him the personal title of archbishop on the occasion of his 50-year jubilee in the priesthood. He became an honorary citizen of Meppen in 1950 and of Osnabrück in 1952. In October 1954, he was awarded the Grand Cross with Star of the Order of Merit, the only federal decoration of the Federal Republic of Germany. Berning died of a heart attack in Osnabrück on 23 November 1955. At the time of his death, he had been a bishop for 41 years, longer than any other living German bishop.

== See also ==
- Catholic bishops in Nazi Germany
- Catholic resistance to Nazi Germany
- Nazi euthanasia and the Catholic Church
- Nazi persecution of the Catholic Church in Germany

== Sources ==
- Evans, Richard J. (2005). The Coming of the Third Reich. New York: Penguin Press. ISBN 978-0-143-03469-8.
- Evans, Richard J. (2009). The Third Reich at War. New York: Penguin Press. ISBN 978-1-594-20206-3.
- Friedländer, Saul (1997). Nazi Germany and the Jews: The Years of Persecution 1933–1939. Vol. 1. Weidenfeld & Nicolson. ISBN 978-0-297-81882-3.
- Klee, Ernst (2007). Das Personenlexikon zum Dritten Reich. Wer war was vor und nach 1945. Frankfurt-am-Main: Fischer-Taschenbuch-Verlag. ISBN 978-3-596-16048-8.
- Klemens-August Recker: Wem wollt ihr glauben?": Bischof Berning im Dritten Reich. 2nd edition. F. Schöningh, Paderborn 1998, ISBN 978-3-506-77055-4.
- Lilla, Joachim (2005). Der Preußische Staatsrat 1921–1933: Ein biographisches Handbuch. Düsseldorf: Droste Verlag. ISBN 978-3-770-05271-4.
- Phayer, Michael (2000). The Catholic Church and the Holocaust, 1930–1965. Bloomington and Indianapolis: Indiana University Press. ISBN 978-0-253-33725-2.
- Shirer, William (1960). The Rise and Fall of the Third Reich. New York: Simon and Schuster. ISBN 978-0-831-77404-2.
