= Antonius Hilfrich =

German priest and Roman Catholic Bishop

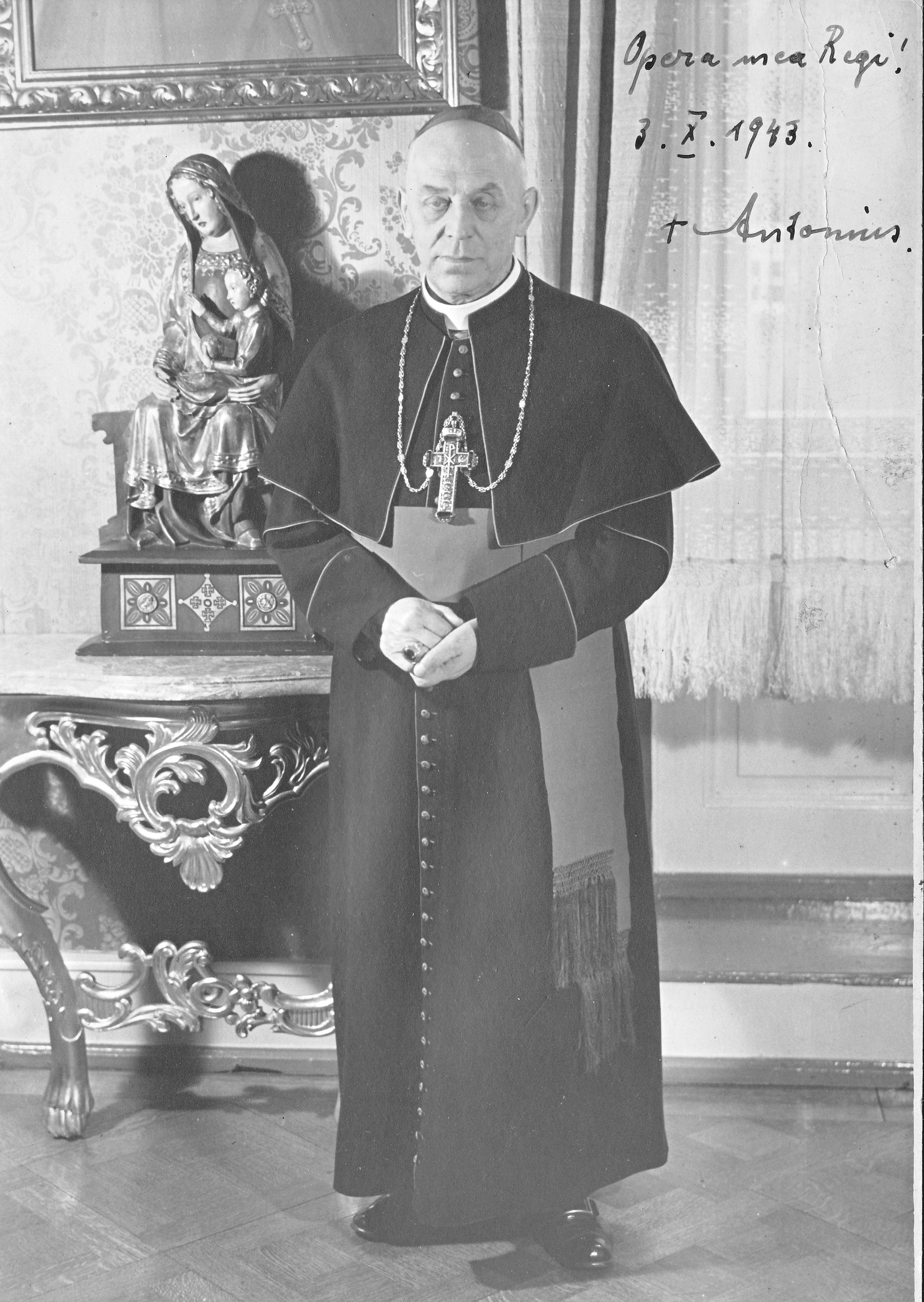
Bishop Antonius Hilfrich in 1943

Coat of arms of Antonius Hilfrich.

Antonius Hilfrich (also Anton Hilfrich; 3 October 1873 – 5 February 1947) was a German priest and Roman Catholic Bishop of Limburg, Germany.

Ordained in 1898, in March 1930 he was appointed Coadjutor Bishop of Limburg and Titular Bishop of Sebastopolis in Armenia. In June 1930 he was ordained Titular Bishop of Sebastopolis in Armenia, and he became Bishop of Limburg that October.

Amid 1941 Catholic protests over Nazi euthanasia led by Bishop Clemens August von Galen of Münster, Hilfrich wrote to Franz Gürtner, the German Minister for Justice, to denounce the murders, calling them an "injustice that cries out to heaven".

== See also ==
- Catholic Church and Nazi Germany
- Catholic resistance to Nazism

== External pages ==
- Petition of Bishop of Limburg to the Reich Minister of Justice Concerning Killing of Patients at the State Hospital for the Mentally Ill at Hadamar 13 August 1941
