= International Catholic–Jewish Historical Commission =

The International Catholic–Jewish Historical Commission was a body appointed by the Holy See's Pontifical Commission for Religious Relations with the Jews in 1999. With three Jewish and three Catholic scholars, the group evaluated Actes et documents du Saint Siège relatifs à la Seconde Guerre Mondiale, 11 volumes of the Vatican's wartime documents devoted to Pope Pius XII. In October 2000, the group issued a preliminary report with 47 questions on the Vatican's response to the Holocaust.

== Disbandment ==
In 2001, after failing to gain access to the Vatican archives after 1923, the group disbanded amid controversy. Unsatisfied with the findings, Michael Marrus, one of the three Jewish members of the commission, said the commission "ran up against a brick wall.... It would have been really helpful to have had support from the Holy See on this issue." By contrast, Vatican officials charged that the panel did a poor job of evaluating the material and leaked information to the press with the purpose of disrupting the Vatican's response to the report.

Cardinal William Keeler released a public statement after the commission dissolved itself, explaining the Catholic side's version of the events.

== See also ==
- Pontifical Commission for Religious Relations with the Jews
- Pope Pius XII and the Holocaust
- Relations between Catholicism and Judaism
