= Day of Judaism =

Day of reflection for Churches on their relationship to Jews and Judaism

The day of Judaism is an annual day of Christian-Jewish reflection held on January 17 by the Roman Catholic Church in Italy since 1990.

In 1997, the idea was brought by the interreligious group, Teshuva, from Milan into the 2nd European Ecumenical Assembly (1997) and spread in the Churches of Europe. Since 2001, the Italian Episcopal Conference was joined by the Italian Jewish community in its promotion. In 2005, both sides assumed a ten-year programme of reflection on the Ten Commandments.

In January 2009, the assembly of Italian rabbis announced a boycott of the day of Judaism because of a dispute surrounding the modern usage of the Good Friday Prayer for the Jews in Catholic liturgies. The event was nevertheless held by the Catholic bishops of Italy, who ignored the rabbinical boycott. An agreement to resume participation eventually occurred at a meeting organized by Cardinal Angelo Bagnasco and chief Rabbi Riccardo Di Segni.

In October 2009, Pope Benedict XVI indicated that he would celebrate the following day of Judaism in 2010 by paying a visit to the Great Synagogue of Rome, which has been similarly visited by Pope John Paul II during his pontificate.
