= Pope Benedict XVI and Judaism =

The relations between Pope Benedict XVI and Judaism remained fairly good, although concerns were raised by Jewish leaders over the political impact of Traditionalists in the Church during the papacy of Benedict.

== Election ==
When Benedict ascended to the Papacy his election was welcomed by the Anti-Defamation League who noted "his great sensitivity to Jewish history and the Holocaust". However, his election received a more reserved response from the United Kingdom's Chief Rabbi Jonathan Sacks who hoped that Benedict would "continue along the path of Pope John XXIII and Pope John Paul II in working to enhance relations with the Jewish people and the State of Israel." The Foreign Minister of Israel also offered more tentative praise, though the Minister believed that "this Pope, considering his historical experience, will be especially committed to an uncompromising fight against anti-Semitism."

== Cologne synagogue ==
Shortly after his election the Pontiff visited the Cologne synagogue where, speaking to Jewish leaders, he condemned Nazi ideology as "insane" and committed to strengthening ties of "friendship" between the Catholic Church and Jews. However, despite much praise from Jewish leaders across Europe, Benedict received criticism from Israel for not "singling out the Jewish state as a victim of terrorism."

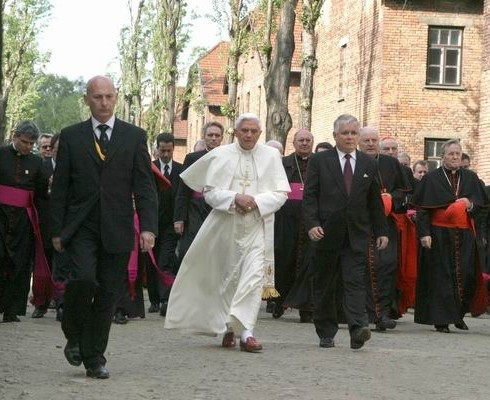
Pope Benedict visiting Auschwitz in 2006.

== Auschwitz ==
In 2006 Pope Benedict visited Auschwitz where he recounted the vital historical tie between Christianity and Judaism. The Pope said the Nazis' aim was "By destroying Israel, they ultimately wanted to tear up the tap root of the Christian faith and to replace it with a faith of their own invention". While the visit was received as a warm gesture, one Rabbi noted "Will it make any difference to Jewish-Catholic relations?...No, because Jewish-Catholic relations anyway are no longer based upon our view of the past but on the nature of relations in the present, and from that perspective Benedict XVI is as good as it gets."

== First 100 days ==
According to rabbi Gary Bretton-Granatoor, the "first 100 days" in the papacy of Benedict XVI were good for the Jews. Rabbi Bretton-Granatoor wrote that the facts on the ground are all that's needed to show that the improvement of relations between the Roman Catholic Church and the Jews—begun 40 years ago with the Second Vatican Council and a major legacy of Pope John Paul II—would continue during the tenure of the new pontiff.

== Scholarly relationship with Jacob Neusner ==
Rabbi Jacob Neusner has written a number of works exploring the relationship of Judaism to other religions. His A Rabbi Talks with Jesus (Philadelphia, 1993; translated into German, Italian, and Swedish) attempts to establish a religiously sound framework for Judaic-Christian interchange. Neusner has earned the praise of Pope Benedict XVI and the nickname of "Pope's Favorite Rabbi". In his book Jesus of Nazareth, Benedict refers to it as "by far the most important book for the Jewish-Christian dialogue in the last decade."

== US Synagogue ==
Despite deteriorating relations the Vatican claimed it was still dedicated to dialogue with the Jewish faith, and in what was called an "unprecedented outreach effort" Benedict visited Park East Synagogue in New York City, the United States, on the eve of Passover 2008. Rabbi Arthur Schneier, the leader of Park East, stated that the Pope's visit was a "tangible expression of his [the Pope] outreach to the largest Jewish community in the world outside of Israel. ...The very clear message is that Jews and Catholics and Christians, we are in the same boat, we have common concerns for humanity."

== Pius XII ==
However, shortly after the Pope's visit to America speculation arose that the Pontiff intended to accelerate the canonization process of World War II pope Pius XII. Pius XII's role in the Second World War had been an underlying issue in Catholic-Jewish relations throughout Benedict's papacy, and indeed that of John Paul II. Many believe that Pius turned a blind eye to the Holocaust and did not confront Hitler's policies. Jewish groups across the world began to condemn Pius XII and any attempts to canonize him. Despite Jewish opposition Benedict maintained support for Pius XII, saying that the wartime pontiff "acted in a secret and silent way because, given the realities of that complex historical moment, he realised that it was only in this way that he could avoid the worst and save the greatest possible number of Jews."

== Society of Saint Pius X ==
Catholic-Jewish relations suffered a setback when, in January 2009, Pope Benedict lifted the excommunications of four bishops of the Society of Saint Pius X (SSPX). The SSPX has rejected all inter-religious dialogue with Judaism and is opposed to dual-covenant theology. The society was reported to have perpetuated the Jewish deicide and Jewish world domination plot canards in its official newsletters and on several of its websites internationally (although the offending websites have been removed since the controversy surrounding the bishops' reinstatement).

=== Richard Williamson ===
One of the bishops whose excommunication was lifted was Richard Williamson, a bishop who believed that there were no gas chambers used in any concentration camp. From this much anger has arisen from Jewish communities, The Jewish Agency for Israel, Yad Vashem, Elie Wiesel (Nobel prize laureate and Holocaust survivor) and the Central Council of Jews in Germany have all condemned the decision to lift the excommunication and the chief Rabbinate of Israel decided to cut ties with the Vatican. The controversy also attracted attention from outside the Jewish community with German Chancellor Angela Merkel calling on Benedict to issue a "very clear" rejection of Holocaust denial.

The Vatican spokesman, Father Federico Lombardi, said that "the condemnation of statements that deny the Holocaust could not have been clearer and that the pope had made his position crystal clear in the past, e.g. in Cologne and Auschwitz. The British newspaper The Guardian reported in February 2009 that as a result of the events surrounding Williamson, Pope Benedict's judgment and ability were now being called into question by numerous voices both within and outside the Roman Catholic Church.

The Vatican officially responded to the row when Father Lombardi, the Pope's press secretary, denied that the lifting of the excommunication endorsed Williamson's stance. He stated that the repeal had "nothing to do with the highly criticisable statements of an individual." Also defending the Pope's actions was Monsignor Robert Wister, professor of church history at Seton Hall University in New Jersey. He pointed out that "To deny the Holocaust is not a heresy even though it is a lie ...The excommunication can be lifted because he [Williamson] is not a heretic, but he remains a liar." As the coverage of the controversy escalated the Vatican newspaper L'Osservatore Romano reaffirmed that Pope Benedict XVI deplored all forms of anti-Semitism and that he called upon all Roman Catholics to follow suit. Benedict later personally declared "full and indisputable solidarity" with Jews, while the Vatican denied that they had any knowledge of Williamson's Holocaust denial.

Yad Vashem Chairman Avner Shalev said: “When the highest moral authority of the Church states that Holocaust denial is unacceptable, that is a vital message for the entire world”.

== Tridentine Mass ==
In 2007, Benedict issued Summorum Pontificum which is widely seen as an attempt to heal the rift with the SSPX. The decree allowed for wider use of the Tridentine Mass which includes a Good Friday prayer:

Let us pray also for the Jews: that almighty God may remove the veil from their hearts; so that they too may acknowledge Jesus Christ our Lord. Let us pray. Let us kneel. Arise. Almighty and eternal God, who dost also not exclude from thy mercy the Jews: hear our prayers, which we offer for the blindness of that people; that acknowledging the light of thy Truth, which is Christ, they may be delivered from their darkness. Through the same Lord Jesus Christ, who liveth and reigneth with thee in the unity of the Holy Spirit, God, for ever and ever. Amen.

The Anti-Defamation league described Benedict's decision as "a body blow to Catholic-Jewish relations". Some Jewish leaders "feared revival of the prayer would undo four decades of progress following Nostra aetate, the 1965 document that absolved the Jews of the killing of Jesus and marked a new period of Jewish-Catholic relations."

In response to these concerns, Pope Benedict revised the prayer and eliminated all references to the "blindness" and "darkness" of the Jews. David Rosen, chairman of the International Jewish Committee for Interreligious Consultations, told the Jerusalem Post that the removal of references to the “darkness” and the “blindness” of the Jews for refusing to recognize Jesus as the messiah was a sign Pope Benedict was "deeply committed to advancing the relationship with the Jewish Community."

== Relations with Israel ==
Cardinal Renato Martino had been critical of the 2008-2009 war in Gaza, describing the Strip as a "big concentration camp". This caused a short-lived crisis in Vatican-Israel relations. The Yad Vashem Museum has also continued to display a very negative caption on Pope Pius XII, which has been strongly criticized by the Holy See. The Fundamental Accord of 1993 remains unsettled because of disputes over property rights and tax exemptions.

== Visit to Israel ==
However, amid claims that the Pope was ruining Jewish-Catholic relations, the Israeli ambassador to the Holy See stated that "the climate is good" and said he believed there was "a lot of potential for the cooperation" between the Vatican and Israel. In May 2009, Pope Benedict XVI visited Israel to stress the shared roots of Judaism, Christianity, and Islam. He said that his pilgrimage to the Middle East was a reminder of the "inseparable bond" between the Catholic Church and the Jewish people. He spoke from Mount Nebo, the wind-swept hill overlooking the Jordan valley from where the Bible says Moses saw the Promised Land. The sun broke through the morning mist just before he arrived at the site.

The Government of Israel also inaugurated a special website dedicated to the Pope’s pilgrimage to Israel. The website, Pope Benedict XVI in Israel, presented in eight languages (English, French, Spanish, Portuguese, Polish, Italian, German and Hebrew), contains information and updates on the Papal pilgrimage, Israel-Vatican relations, Christian communities in Israel and Christian holy sites throughout the country.

The Pope made a speech at Yad Vashem, one of the world's foremost Holocaust museums. The speech expressed "deep compassion" for the "millions of Jews killed," but did not implicate any Catholic guilt for the Holocaust, nor use the words "German", "Nazi", or "murder", nor did he discuss his own personal wartime experience in which he was "registered in the Hitler Youth". It was widely criticized for its banality and its omissions, including by the director of Yad Vashem. The Pope also refused to go inside the museum because the museum paints an unflattering picture of Pius XII, the pope during the Holocaust, "for not doing enough to help save Jews."

Benedict later denounced the "brutal extermination" of Jews by "a godless regime" as he wrapped up his trip to Israel, although once again he didn't explicitly mention the name of that regime (the Nazis or Germans) or any possible guilt on the part of the Church.

According to journalist Richard Boudreaux, Benedict's farewell remarks from the tarmac at Tel Aviv's airport pleased both Israelis and Palestinians, many of whom had initially viewed him with skepticism. Some said later they felt vindication from portions of his carefully worded statements and a measure of respect for his moral authority. The World Jewish Congress subsequently praised the visit, calling it a milestone for understanding between Christians and Jews.

== Great Synagogue of Rome ==
In October 2009, Benedict XVI indicated that he would celebrate the following day of Judaism in 2010 by paying a visit to the Great Synagogue of Rome, which has been similarly visited by Pope John Paul II during his pontificate.

== Jews and Jesus ==
In his 2011 book Jesus of Nazareth: Holy Week, Pope Benedict exonerated Jews of allegations they were responsible for Jesus Christ’s death, with details and a close comparison of various New Testament accounts of Jesus’ condemnation to death by the Roman governor Pontius Pilate. He concluded that the “real group of accusers” were the Temple authorities and not all Jews of the time, and he wrote that Jesus' death wasn't about punishment, but rather salvation. Jesus' blood, he said, "does not cry out for vengeance and punishment, it brings reconciliation. It is not poured out against anyone, it is poured out for many, for all."
