= Pope Benedict XV and Judaism =

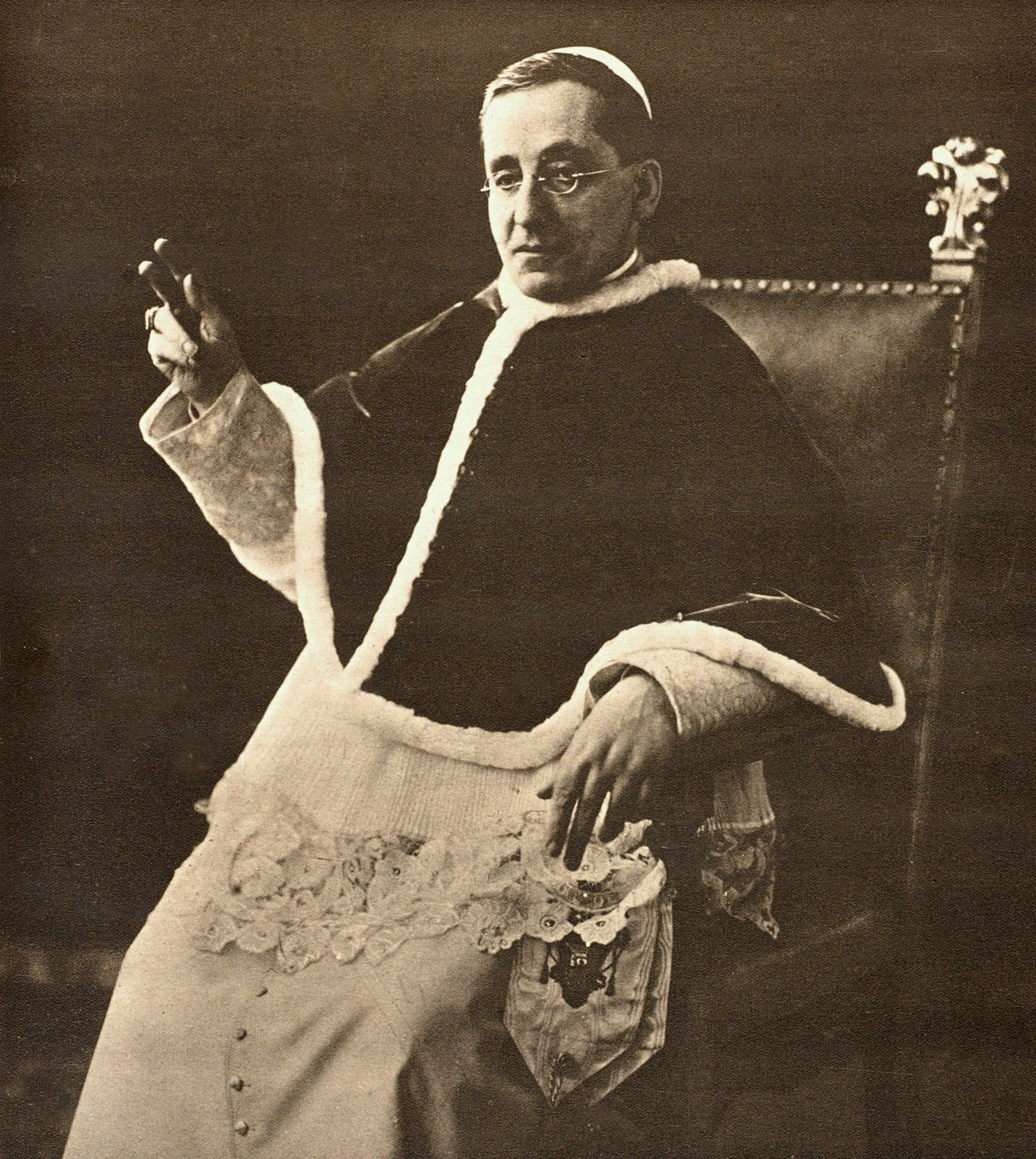
Pope Benedict XV, c. 1920

The relations between Pope Benedict XV and Judaism were marked by two significant historical events: the emigration of Eastern European Jewish communities due to World War I and to pogroms, and the development of Zionism in the Middle East and its effects on local Levantine, Greek-Catholic and Arab Christian communities.

== Requests in favour of Polish Jews ==
In 1916, in the midst of the First World War, American Jews petitioned Pope Benedict XV on behalf of the Polish Jews. To this the pontiff responded in a private letter, also published in the Jesuit journal "Civilta Cattolica", denouncing antisemitism:

The Supreme Pontiff.... as Head of the Catholic Church, which, faithful to its divine doctrines and its most glorious traditions, considers all men as brothers and teaches them to love one another, he never ceases to indicate among individuals, as well as among peoples, the observance of the principles of the natural law, and to condemn everything that violates them. This law must be observed and respected in the case of the children of Israel, as well as of all others, because it would not be conformable to justice or to religion itself to derogate from it solely on account of divergence of religious confessions.

== Effects of the letter ==
The letter had asked the Pope to exert his authority to halt the mistreatment of Jews throughout the world, in particular the pogroms on the Russian front. The Pope declined to do so since he said he had no way of confirming the facts claimed in the letter. The Pope's letter said nothing about equality in civil rights nor any rejection of social, political, or legal restrictions on Jews (so long as such restrictions did not violate natural law) that aimed at limiting “harmful” Jewish influences on society. Martin Rhonheimer concludes that it is fair to assume that the people responsible for the pogroms never learned of the papal letter.

== Reaction to the Zionist movement ==
Nahum Sokolov, author, journalist and board member of the Zionist World Congress, came to Rome to gain support for the plan of Jewish settlement in Palestine. That the Pope, Benedict XV (1914–22), had vehemently condemned antisemitism a year before was seen as a good omen.

== Role of Eugenio Pacelli ==
Cardinal Secretary of State Pietro Gasparri sent Sokolov to Msgr. Eugenio Pacelli who received him in a friendly mood and took the time to listen to him with patience and great personal interest. Later, in his report to the Executive Committee of the Zionists, Sokolov praised the heartfelt openness he experienced during his meeting with the Monsignor and admitted that he was completely surprised when Pacelli asked him, in the most friendly way, if he would not like to present his issue to the Pope. Sokolov would have never dreamt that this would be possible for a Jew. But then, on May 6, 1917, he was received for 45 minutes (longer than many heads of states) by Benedict XV.
